= Beate Klarsfeld =

Franco-German journalist and anti-Nazi activist (born 1939)

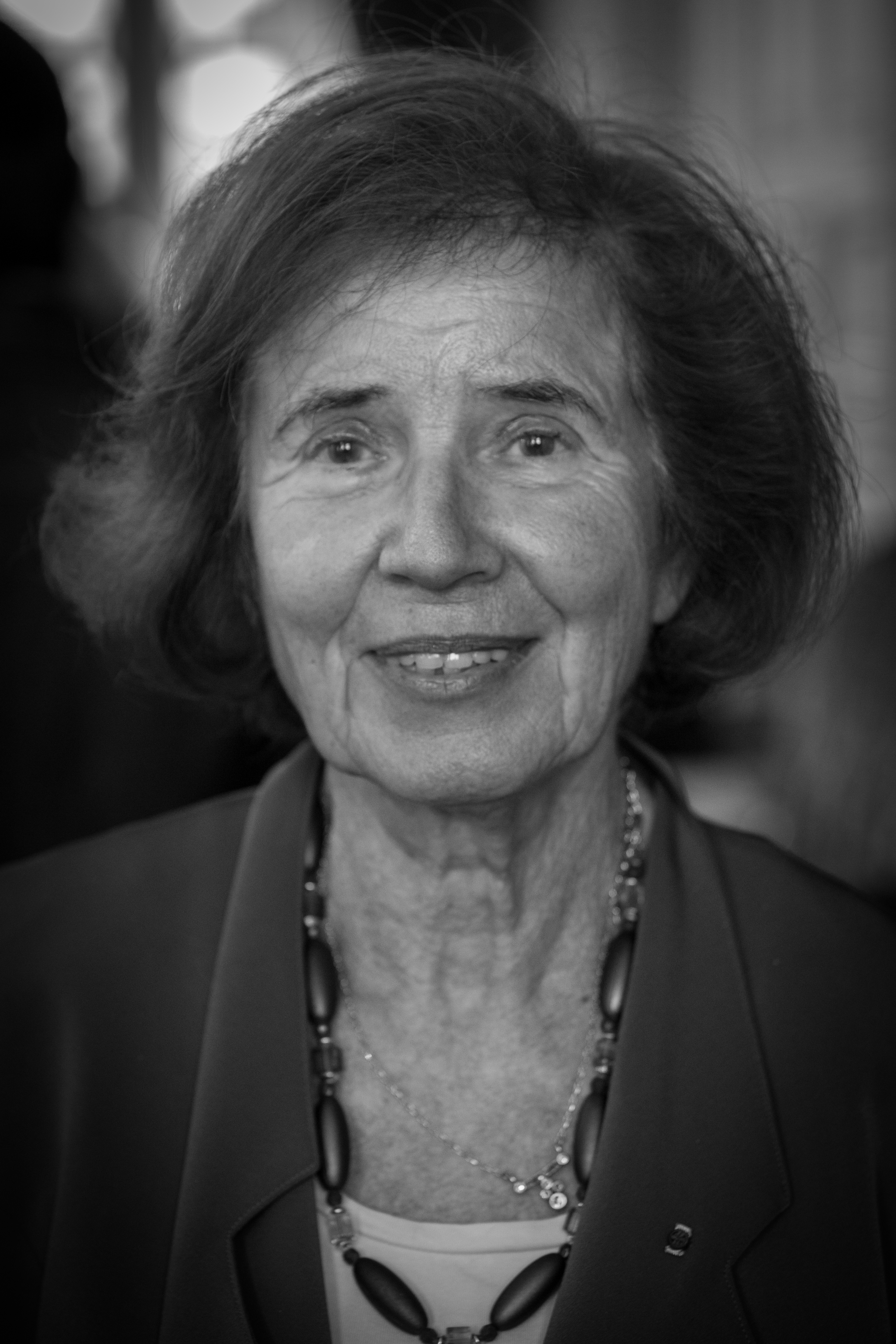
- Klarsfeld in 2015
- Born: Beate Auguste Künzel; 13 February 1939 (age 87); Berlin, Nazi Germany
- Political party: The Left
- Spouse: Serge Klarsfeld (m. 1963)
- Children: 2

Beate Auguste Klarsfeld (née Künzel; born 13 February 1939) is a Franco-German journalist and Nazi hunter who, along with her French husband, Serge Klarsfeld, became famous for their investigation and documentation of numerous Nazi war criminals, including Kurt Lischka, Alois Brunner, Klaus Barbie, Ernst Ehlers and Kurt Asche.

In March 2012, she ran as the candidate for The Left in the 2012 German presidential election against Joachim Gauck, but lost by 126 to 991.

== Biography ==
=== Early life ===
Beate Auguste Künzel was born in Berlin, the only child of Kurt Künzel, an insurance clerk, and his wife, Helen. Her parents were not Nazis, according to Klarsfeld; however, they had voted for the Nazi leader Adolf Hitler. Her father was drafted in the summer of 1939 into the infantry. From the summer of 1940, he fought with his unit in France and was moved in 1941 to the eastern front. In the following winter, because he had contracted double pneumonia, he was transferred back to Germany and worked as an accountant. Beate spent several months in Łódź with her godfather, who was a Nazi official.

The Berlin apartment in which she lived was bombed and relatives in Sandau gave shelter to Beate and her mother. Her father joined them in 1945. The house and property in Sandau were seized by the Polish government, and the family returned to Berlin. From the age of fourteen, Beate began to frequently argue with her parents because they did not feel responsible for the Nazi era, focused on the injustices and material losses they had suffered.

=== Move to Paris ===
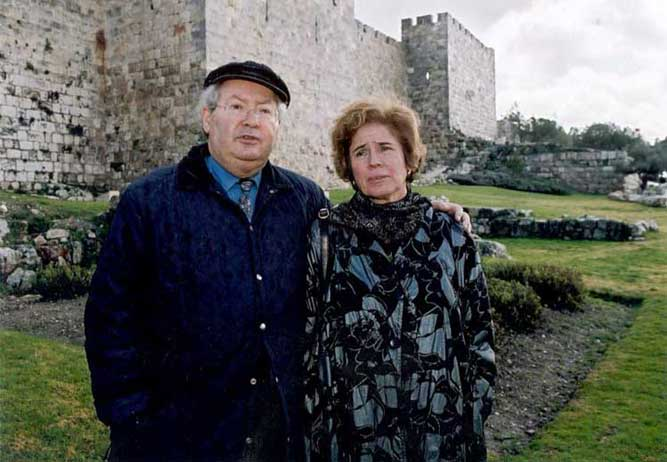
Klarsfeld with her husband Serge visiting Jerusalem (2007)

In 1960, Beate Künzel spent a year as an au pair in Paris. By her own admission, at that time politics and history were completely foreign to her. However, in Paris she was confronted with the consequences of the Holocaust. In 1963, she married the French lawyer and historian Serge Klarsfeld, whose father was a victim of the Auschwitz concentration camp exterminations. Beate has said that her husband helped her to become "a German of conscience and awareness".

The couple had two children: Arno David Klarsfeld (born 1965) and Lida Myriam (born 1973). In 1964 Beate began work as a secretary at the new Franco-German Youth Office. There she published a guide for German au pair girls living in Paris. During a year of unpaid leave after the birth of her son, she became increasingly involved with feminist literature and with the emancipation of women in Germany. By the end of 1966, she and her family moved into an apartment shared with her mother-in-law and the three-member family of Serge's sister.

=== Action against Kiesinger ===
Following a German government crisis in October and November 1966, and while the Klarsfelds were in Paris, Kurt Georg Kiesinger (CDU member) was chosen as the new German chancellor, supported by a coalition of the political parties CDU and SPD. In an article published on 14 January 1967 in the French newspaper Combat, Beate Klarsfeld, at the time a foreign member of the SPD, came out against Kiesinger occupying the post of chancellor and in favour of Willy Brandt. In these and other pieces for Combat in March and on 27 July of that year she accused Kiesinger of having made a "good reputation" for himself "in the ranks of the Brown Shirts" and "in the CDU". At the end of August, she was fired by the Franco-German Youth Office. The Klarsfelds initiated legal action against the decision and redoubled their journalistic campaign against Kiesinger.

To draw attention to Kiesinger's Nazi past, Beate Klarsfeld initiated a campaign with various public gestures. It was revealed that Kiesinger had registered as a member of the Nazi Party in late February 1933 and by 1940 had risen to be deputy head of the political broadcasting department at the Foreign Ministry, a unit responsible for influencing foreign broadcasts. Kiesinger was in charge of liaison with the Reich Propaganda Ministry. Beate Klarsfeld accused Kiesinger of being a member of the board of Inter Radio AG, which had been buying foreign radio stations for propaganda purposes.

She also asserted that Kiesinger had been chiefly responsible for the contents of German international broadcasts which included anti-Semitic and war propaganda, and had collaborated closely with SS functionaries Gerhard Rühle and Franz Alfred Six. The latter was responsible for mass murders in Eastern Europe. She alleged that Kiesinger had continued to produce anti-Semitic propaganda even after becoming aware of the extermination of the Jews. These allegations were based in part on the Braunbuch, a work of East German propaganda.

On 2 April 1968, from the public gallery in the Bonn Bundestag (German parliament), Klarsfeld shouted "Nazi Kiesinger, resign!" at Kiesinger, and was arrested to be released soon after. According to archives, she traveled to East Berlin in the end of April 1968 in order "to discuss the preparation of actions against Kiesinger and obtain appropriate support" there with the National Council, the supreme body of the National Front. On 9 May she was in West Berlin, for a demonstration of the extra-parliamentary opposition about Kiesinger's Nazi past. A press conference was scheduled for 10 May. On 14 May, Klarsfeld wanted to organize a "Kiesinger-Colloquium" in Paris. The West Department of the Socialist Unity Party of Germany (SED) Central Committee immediately informed Walter Ulbricht, its leader, of Klarsfeld's plans. Subsequently, the National Council was instructed "to provide any relevant assistance to Mrs Klarsfeld". She was eventually supported by the publication of a brochure with a circulation of 30,000 copies. However, the financial help she wished for was not granted.

On 9 May, Klarsfeld participated in a panel discussion with Günter Grass (who had urged Kiesinger to resign in 1966), Johannes Agnoli, Ekkehart Krippendorff, Jacob Taubes and Michel Lang (a student from the "Jewish Working Group for Politics") at Technische Universität Berlin. Klarsfeld, who presented Kiesinger as a major threat to Germany, promised those present to try to slap him publicly. This was greeted with laughter by part of the audience, including representatives of the Sozialistischer Deutscher Studentenbund (SDS). Grass's thesis that a withdrawal by Kiesinger would be a prerequisite for an effective fight against the far-right NPD, was rejected by Agnoli and Krippendorff. The conference ended with a 3/4 majority urging Kiesinger to resign.

In mid-1968, as a witness in a lawsuit, Kiesinger stated that he had not heard about the murder of Jews until 1942 and that it had not been until late 1944, on the strength of foreign reports, that he had first believed any of it. During a CDU party conference in the Berlin Congress Hall, in West Berlin, on 7 November 1968, Klarsfeld mounted the podium, slapped Kiesinger, and shouted "Nazi, Nazi, Nazi".

A few days later, during an interview with Der Spiegel she maintained that she had already planned the slap on 9 May 1968. She said that she had wanted to give voice to that part of the German people – especially the youth – who were opposed to a Nazi being the head of the Federal Government. Berlin was selected as the location because Klarsfeld and her husband expected that as a French citizen she would only be punished mildly, given the four-power status of the city.

The same day, on 7 November 1968, Klarsfeld received a 1-year custodial sentence in an accelerated hearing, but due to her dual citizenship she was not actually incarcerated. Her defense attorney was Horst Mahler. The judge justified the scale of the penalty – it was the strictest penalty possible under an accelerated procedure – on the grounds that political beliefs should not be demonstrated with violence, and stated that he had not been influenced by the fact of the victim being the Chancellor. Klarsfeld appealed against the verdict, which in late 1969, was reduced to four months in prison, which were suspended on probation.

In recognition of her action, author Heinrich Böll sent red roses to her in Paris. Günter Grass, however, deemed Klarsfeld's action "irrational" and criticized Böll's reaction to it. During a wave of violence gestures and attacks by the student movement following the judgment against Klarsfeld, the judge's windows were pelted with stones, which the SDS called "an adequate response to an unparalleled terror judgment".

Klarsfeld justified the act in a poem that she recorded on 23 November 1968, saying that her slap was on behalf of 50 million dead of World War II as well as for future generations. She wanted it to be understood as a slap in the "repulsive face of ten million Nazis".

Klarsfeld was accompanied by her mother on 11 November 1968 in Brussels where two days later Kiesinger was to speak on the evening of 13 November 1968 to the Grandes Conférences Catholiques. She was advised to leave the country by the Belgian police. In 1969 she joined the Waldshut constituency federal election campaign as a direct candidate of the leftist Aktion Demokratischer Fortschritt against the direct candidate of the CDU, Chancellor Kiesinger. Kiesinger received 60,373 votes, Klarsfeld 644.

=== Other activities ===
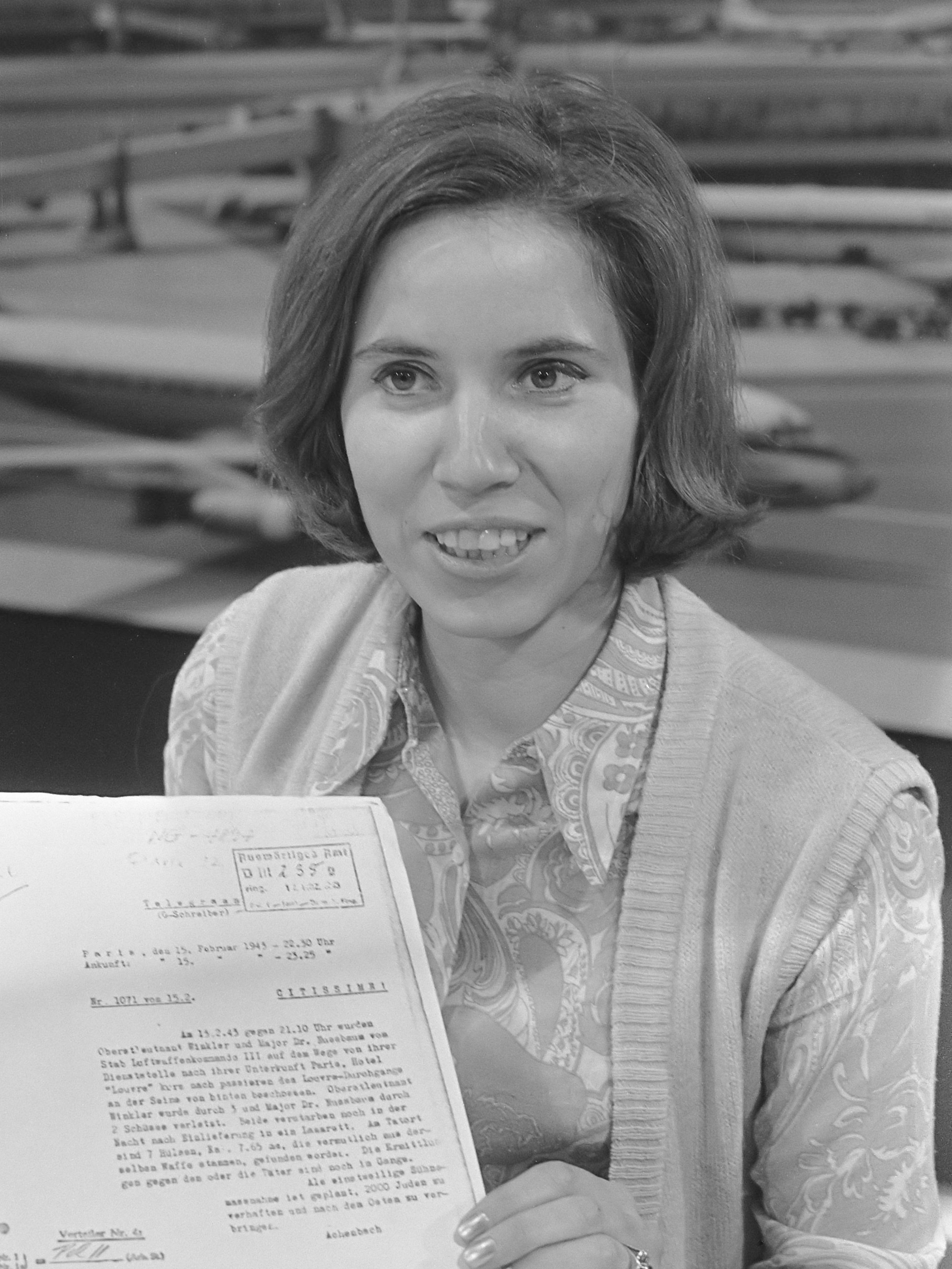
Beate Klarsfeld (1970) shows one of Achenbach's reports from 1943

In February 1971 Klarsfeld demonstrated in front of the Charles University in Prague against "Stalinisation, persecution and anti-Semitism". As a result, she was temporarily banned from entering East Germany. That same year in Germany, with her husband and several other people, she tried to kidnap Kurt Lischka, who was responsible for the deportation of some 76,000 Jews from France. Lischka was living openly under his own name in Cologne. Klarsfeld planned to hand him over to justice in Paris, as a previous conviction in France blocked further legal action against Lischka in Germany. Although the kidnapping was unsuccessful, it served to draw media attention to Klarsfeld's cause. She turned herself in to the German authorities, saying that they must arrest either her or Lischka. In 1974 she was sentenced to two months' imprisonment for the attempted kidnapping, with Lischka testifying at her trial. After an international outcry, her sentence was suspended. Lischka remained at large until 1980, when he was sentenced to ten years' imprisonment.

In the 1970s, Klarsfeld repeatedly denounced the involvement of the FDP politician Ernst Achenbach in the deportation of Jews from France. In 1976, she succeeded in stopping Achenbach's political activity as a lobbyist of Nazi war criminals. As the rapporteur of the Foreign Affairs Committee in the Bundestag until 1976, Achenbach was responsible for the Franco-German Supplementary Agreement to the Transition Treaty signed in 1971, and successfully prevented its ratification until 1974 when he was discredited by the campaigns led by the Klarsfelds. In 1984 and 1985 Beate Klarsfeld toured the military dictatorships of Chile and Paraguay, to draw attention to the search for the suspected Nazi war criminals Walter Rauff and Josef Mengele. In 1986 she spent a month in West Beirut, Lebanon, and offered to go into custody in an exchange for Israeli hostages.

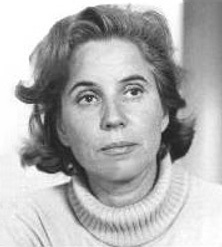
Beate Klarsfeld 1986

In 1986, she campaigned against the candidacy of former UN Secretary General Kurt Waldheim to the post of the Federal President of Austria, on the grounds of his being accused of involvement in war crimes as an officer of the Wehrmacht. She attended his campaign events and after his election she disrupted his appearances in Istanbul and Amman, where she was supported by the World Jewish Congress.

On 4 July 1987, the SS war criminal Klaus Barbie (known as the butcher of Lyon) was convicted on her initiative. Barbie was found guilty of crimes against humanity and he was sentenced to life imprisonment. Klarsfeld rated this success as the most important result of their actions. In 1972 she had helped to discover Barbie's whereabouts in Bolivia. It is thanks to their commitment that the Maison d’Izieu (Children of Izieu) memorial was founded, which commemorates the victims of the crimes committed by Barbie.

In 1991, she fought for the extradition of Eichmann's deputy Alois Brunner, then living in Syria, for the murder of 130,000 Jews in German concentration camps. In 2001, through the efforts of Klarsfeld, Brunner was sentenced by a French court in absentia to life imprisonment.

In July 2001, Klarsfeld called for a demonstration in Berlin against the state visit of the Syrian President Bashar al-Assad.

Beate and Serge Klarsfeld published a commemorative book in which the names of over 80,000 victims of the Nazi era in France are listed. They strove successfully to have the pictures displayed of about 11,400 deported Jewish children in the years 1942 to 1944. The French railway SNCF welcomed the project and displayed the pictures at 18 stations as a traveling exhibition (Enfants juifs Déportés de France). The German Railways (DB), the legal successor of Deutsche Reichsbahn, turned down a corresponding exhibition at DB-stations "for security reasons" and referred them to the DB Museum in Nuremberg. The former DB CEO Hartmut Mehdorn argued the issue was much too serious, for display in German railway stations. Transport Minister Wolfgang Tiefensee spoke out in favor of the exhibition. At the end of 2006 Tiefensee and Mehdorn agreed to support a new, DB owned exhibition on the role of the Reichsbahn in World War II.

The special Deutsche Bahn traveling exhibition "Special Trains to Death" has been shown since 23 January 2008 at numerous German train stations. Since its opening, this exhibition has seen over 150,000 visitors. The hunt for Klaus Barbie was made into the movie Die Hetzjagd (The hunt) of 2008. In 2009, she was again nominated by the parliamentary group Die Linke for the Order of Merit. The award was contingent on the approval of the Foreign Office. The Foreign Minister Guido Westerwelle declined to approve it. In the term of office of Joschka Fischer as foreign minister (1998–2005) the award had been previously vetoed.

Since 2008, Klarsfeld has been, together with Michel Cullin of France, a member of the International Council of the Austrian Service Abroad and has supported the memorial service of young Austrians in Holocaust memorials and Jewish museums around the world.

In October 2015, she was designated as UNESCO Honorary Ambassador and Special Envoys for Education about the Holocaust and the Prevention of Genocide.

In 2020, Klarsfeld approached the then German minister of Defence, Ursula von der Leyen, to stop honoring the Nazi-war criminals in the largest Nazi-cemetery in Europe in Ysselsteyn (Venray, the Netherlands); In 2021 the new German ambassador indeed stopped all forms of honoring such as wreath laying.

Klarsfeld remained friends with Marlene Dietrich until the German film star's death in 1992. Dietrich also lived in Paris and admired the Klarsfelds for their hunt for Klaus Barbie.

== Candidacy for President ==
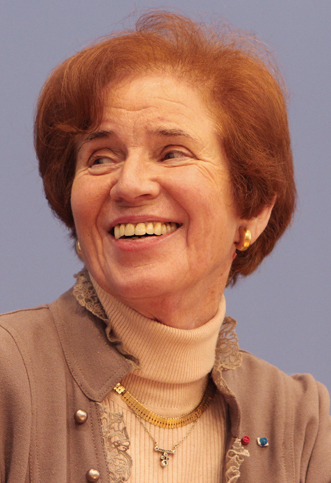
Beate Klarsfeld (2012)

On 27 February 2012, Klarsfeld, after previously Luc Jochimsen and Christoph Butterwegge had been mentioned as possible candidates, was nominated by the board of Die Linke unanimously for the election of the German President in 2012 as a candidate.

Klarsfeld stated that she felt fully supported by The Left in the fight against fascism. The fact that the party had nominated her with knowledge of her commitment to Israel, shows that the party agreed with her on this matter. She did not publish a program for her administration in case of her winning, she did, however, say she wanted to improve the image of Germany. A moral Germany had to be created, one that can bring about social justice in other European countries. Klarsfeld had announced, she would support Incumbent Nicolas Sarkozy in the 2012 French presidential election. She is not troubled to "candidate for The Left of all things" although she would have preferred a nomination by the CDU or the SPD. According to Klarsfeld, the election as President of Germany would be the "highest honor" that she could be granted.

At the end of February 2012, the Saxon State Commissioner for the Stasi files, Lutz Rathenow, discussed in the Tagesspiegel Klarsfeld's contacts with the East German Ministry of State Security. Klarsfeld had indeed supplied no reports and had also not been a player, but did receive material from the Ministry of State Security. According to Rathenow, it "needs a reflection of how far served the Stasi legwork of Nazi Crimes elucidation and where it has harmed."

In 1991, former Stasi officers Günter Bohnsack and Herbert Brehmer made public in an article for Der Spiegel that Klarsfeld received the "incriminating evidence against the former Chancellor Kurt Georg Kiesinger" from East Germany. According to Bohnsack this cooperation began in 1966 and ended only in 1989. The "Plan with the slap" have Klarsfeld "probably concocted itself"; he knew nothing about it before it is executed.

Klarsfeld confirmed that she was not an informer, she said the German Democratic Republic (GDR) offered her access to archives about Nazi criminals in Potsdam. After Klarsfeld actions against antisemitism early 70s in Prague and Warsaw, the GDR had these doors but closed again. The state security background of her interlocutors in East Germany, she was not aware of at the time: "I met with people, which I thought they were historians with access to State archives of the GDR."

On 5 March 2012, Klarsfeld was elected by the Saxon parliament on the list of the Left Group as one of 33 people election as member of the 15th Federal Assembly in 2012.

On 7 March 2012, Welt online published under the article heading "2000 D-Mark for the famous German slap in the face" an internal statement of the SED Politburo member Albert Norden. Norden announced that a week after the slap against Kiesinger, Klarsfeld should be provided 2000 DM "for further initiatives". Officially, the amount should be reported as the fee for an article that she had written for an East German magazine. Referring to this publication, CDU General Secretary Hermann Gröhe denied Klarsfeld's suitability for the office of president. The head of the Berlin-Hohenschönhausen Memorial, Hubertus Knabe, said something similar and attested her a missing "democratic awareness". Asked about the allegations, Klarsfeld called it outrageous to reduce her commitment for Kiesinger's Nazi past to support by East German officials. She said she never worked on behalf of East Germany but on her own behalf. According to Klarsfeld, she used the money to pay for the flight costs of supporters of her anti-Kiesinger campaign on 13 November 1968 in Brussels. As early as 1972 she had described it in her autobiography.

Klarsfeld answer was interpreted by Welt online as an indirect and first-time admission that she had once actually received the 2000 D-Mark. Free Democratic Party General Secretary Patrick Döring said: "If it turns out that in 1968 Ms. Klarsfeld was nothing but an accomplice for a paid SED PR campaign, her candidacy for the highest German state office is a slap in the face for all democrats in our country". The general secretary of the CSU, Alexander Dobrindt, called Klarsfeld a "SED puppet".

The managing director of Die Linke, Caren Lay, described it as an "absurd charge", to discredit Klarsfelds commitment as "commissioned by the GDR". The deputy chairman of the parliamentary faction Dietmar Bartsch said Klarsfeld sought to put the slap Kiesingers a sign, but achieved a great deal more. He opposed equating GDR and Nazism, calling it legitimate that Klarsfeld was supported in her "fight against Nazis" by France, Israel, and also by East Germany.

Die Welt which Klarsfeld had three years earlier honored on her birthday, now published opinion comments, after which "it had little to do with the Klarsfelds" that Klaus Barbie was tried, and the slap in the face was doubtful also because Kiesinger had been a "fellow traveller of the Nazi regime".

When choosing 18 March 2012 voted 126 members of the Federal Assembly for Klarsfeld. These are placed three more than the Left Party delegates. Klarsfeld was against Joachim Gauck, whose candidacy of CDU / CSU, SPD, FDP and Greens had been supported and the 991 votes received.

== Awards ==
- 1974: Beate Klarsfeld received the Israeli "Bravery medal of the Ghetto fighters".
- 1984: French President François Mitterrand named her a Knight of the Legion of Honour
- 2007: French President Jacques Chirac named her an Officer of the Legion of Honour
- 2009: She received the Georg-Elser Prize
- 2011: President Sarkozy awarded her the National Order of Merit
- 2014: French President Francois Hollande named her Commander of the Legion of Honour
- 2015: She and her husband Serge received the Order of Merit of the Federal Republic of Germany, first class.
- 2016: Beate received honorary Israeli citizenship.
- 2018: National Jewish Book Award in the Book of the Year category for Hunting the Truth: Memoirs of Beate and Serge Klarsfeld
- 2024: French President Emmanuel Macron promoted her to Grand Officer of the Legion of Honour.

== Works ==
- Deutsche Mädchen au pair in Paris, Voggenreiter, Bad Godesberg 1965.
- Die Wahrheit über Kiesinger, elan, July/August 1968.
- Die Geschichte des PG 2 633 930 Kiesinger: Dokumentation mit einem Vorwort von Heinrich Böll. Melzer, Darmstadt 1969.
- K oder der subtile faschismus: with Joseph Billig and Vorwort von Heinrich Böll. Extra-Dienst-GmbH, in Verbindung mit dem Jüdischen Aktionskreis (JAK), Berlin, 1969. Signatur der Deutschen Nationalbibliothek Frankfurt am Main: D 69/23806 und Leipzig: SA 22217 - 2.
- Wherever they may be! Vanguard Press, New York 1972, ISBN 0-8149-0748-2.
  - französische Originalausgabe: Partout où ils seront, 1972.
- with Serge Klarsfeld: Die Kinder von Izieu. Eine jüdische Tragödie. Ed. Hentrich, Berlin 1991 (Reihe deutsche Vergangenheit, Nr. 51) ISBN 3-89468-001-6 (auch auf Französisch und Englisch).
- with Serge Klarsfeld: Endstation Auschwitz: Die Deportation deutscher und österreichischer jüdischer Kinder aus Frankreich; ein Erinnerungsbuch. Böhlau, Köln 2008, ISBN 978-3-412-20156-2.
- with Serge Klarsfeld: Erinnerungen. Piper, München/ Berlin 2015, ISBN 978-3-492-05707-3
  - als Hrsg: Liebesbriefe aus dem Wartesaal zum Tod; Briefe von Charlotte Minna Rosenthal, geschrieben von Januar bis August 1942 aus den Internierungslagern Gurs und Brens in Frankreich an ihren Geliebten Rudolph Lewandowski, Stiftung Demokratie Saarland, Saarbrücken, 2013. Signatur der Deutschen Nationalbibliothek Frankfurt am Main: 2013 A 81226 und Leipzig: 2013 A 99942.

== Films ==
- Nazi Hunter: The Beate Klarsfeld Story – TV-Film, USA, France, 1986, ca. 100 Min., Director: Michael Lindsay-Hogg, with Farrah Fawcett as Beate Klarsfeld und Tom Conti as Serge Klarsfeld.
- Manhunt (La Traque) – TV-Film, France, Germany, 2008, 108 Min., Director: Laurent Jaoui, Production: WDR, ARTE, AT-Production, Elzévir Films, RTL-TVI, TERZ Film, Inhaltsangabe von arte, with Hanns Zischler as Klaus Barbie, Franka Potente as Beate Klarsfeld, Yvan Attal as Serge Klarsfeld; Peter Finkelgruen im Interview zum Film
