= Albrecht Glaser =

German politician (born 1942)

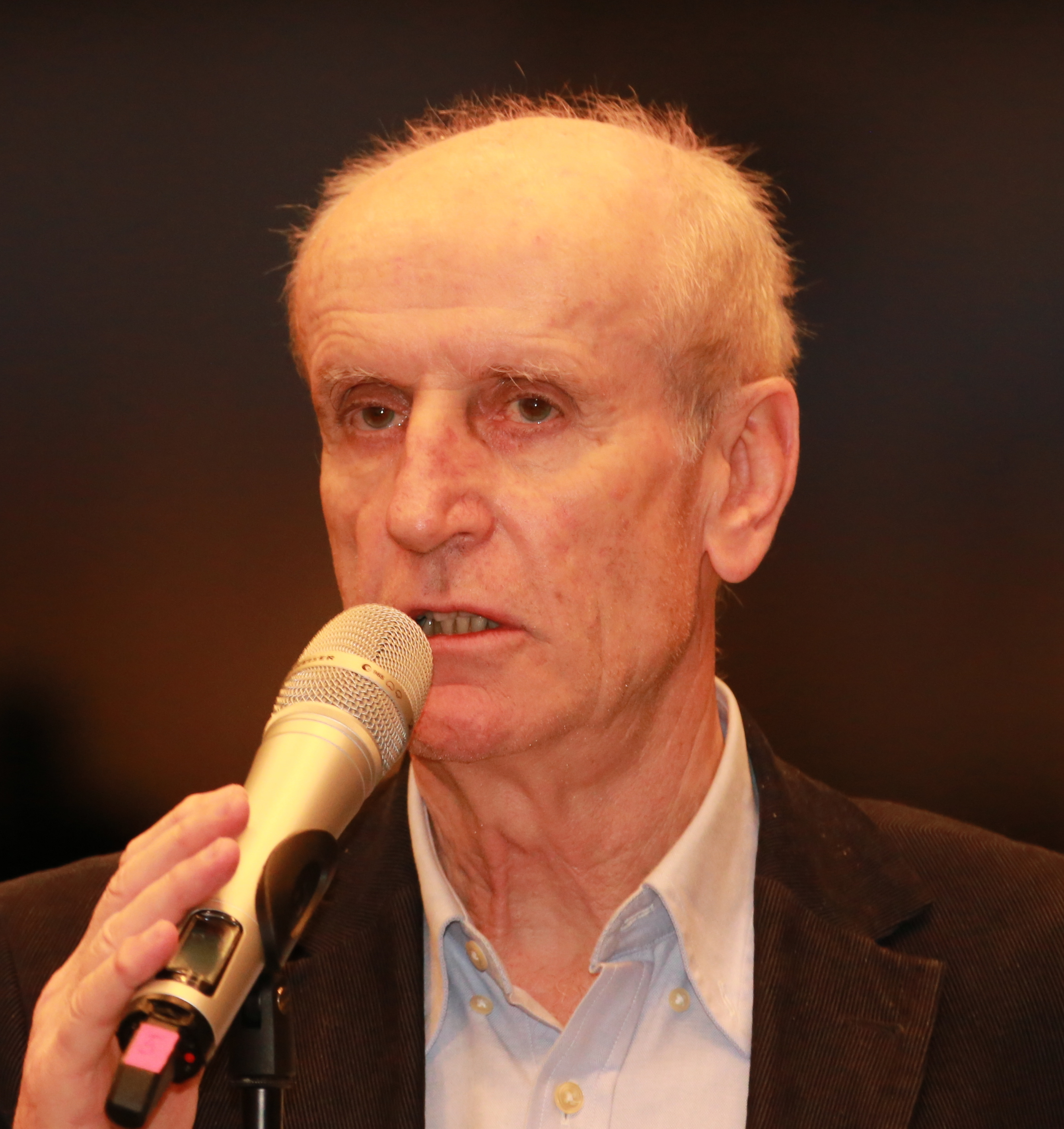
- Glaser in 2015

Personal details
- Born: 8 January 1942 (age 84) Worms, Germany
- Party: AfD (2013–present); CDU (1970–2012)
- Education: Heidelberg University; Tübingen University

Albrecht Heinz Erhard Glaser (born 8 January 1942) is a German politician (AfD, formerly CDU). From 1997 to 2001, he served as the treasurer of Frankfurt.

== Education and personal life ==
Glaser studied at the Heidelberg University, the University of Tübingen and the German University of Administrative Sciences, Speyer.

Glaser is in his second marriage and has four children.

== Politics ==
Glaser joined the Christian Democratic Union (CDU) in 1970. As a local politician, he was Mayor of Bretten, and later from 1980 to 1987 of Waldbronn.

From 1995, he was on the city Council of Frankfurt, and in 1997 took on the position of city treasurer.

In the 16th Federal Convention (2017), Glaser was the Alternative for Germany's (AfD) candidate for President of Germany. He received 42 out of 1,253 electoral votes on the first ballot and finished third behind Frank-Walter Steinmeier (SPD, 931 votes) and Christoph Butterwegge (The Left, 128 votes).

In the 2017 German federal election, he was elected as member of the Bundestag. On 27 September 2017, the AfD group announced that it would propose Glaser as candidate for Vice President of the Bundestag. However, after three rounds of voting, he could not secure the required majority.
