= Christoph Butterwegge =

German political scientist and poverty researcher

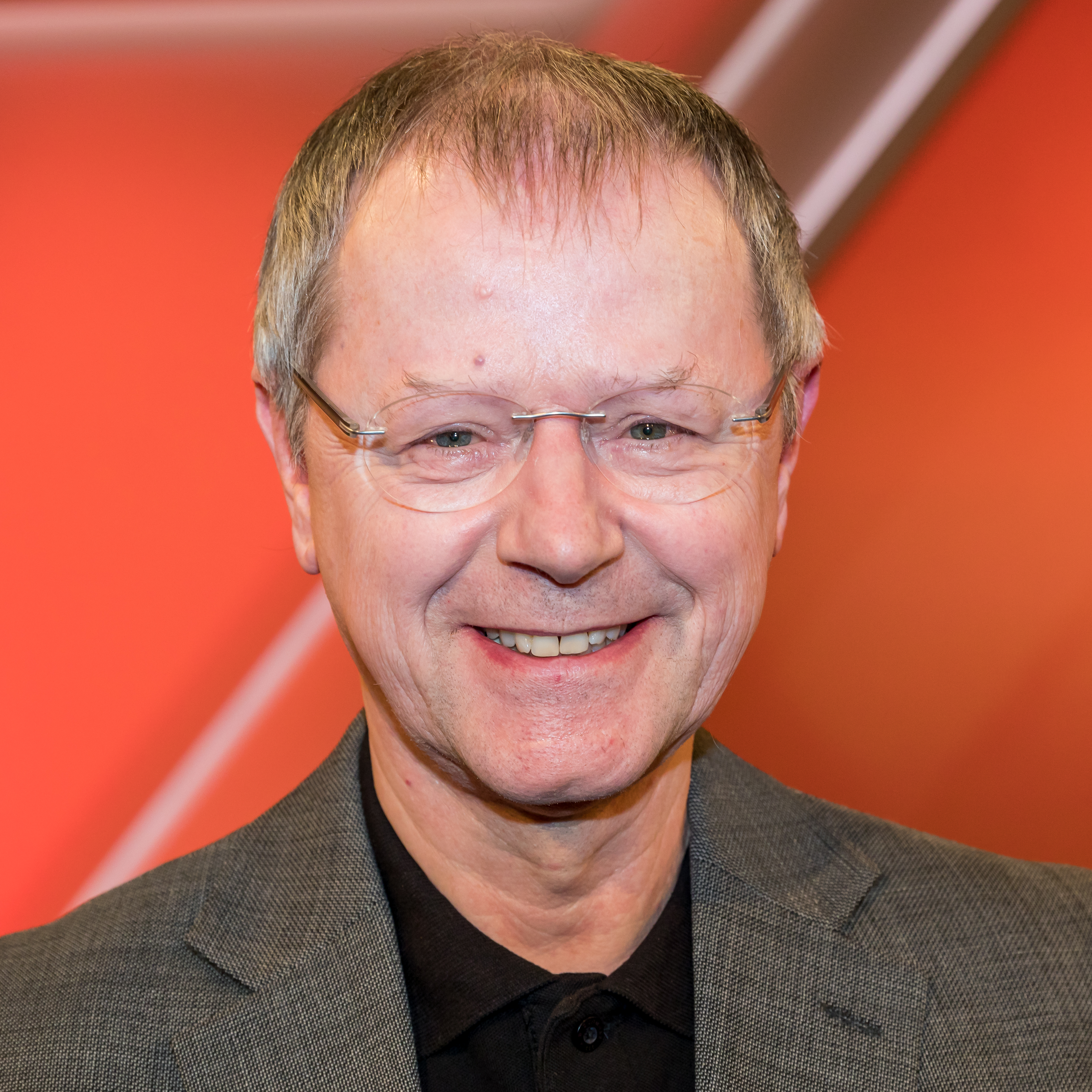
- Butterwegge in 2018
- Born: 26 January 1951 (age 75); Albersloh, North Rhine-Westphalia, West Germany (now Germany)
- Education: University of Bremen
- Occupations: Political scientist; Politician
- Political party: None

Christoph Butterwegge (born 26 January 1951) is a German political scientist and poverty researcher. From 1998 to 2016 he was Professor of Political Science at the Institute for Comparative Education and Social Sciences at the Humanities Faculty of the University of Cologne and is a member of the Research Center for Intercultural Studies (FiSt).

Long active in political circles, Butterwegge was a member of the Social Democratic Party (SPD) from 1970 to 1975 and again from 1987 to 2005. After leaving the SPD, he has openly praised Die Linke but has never joined the party. On 21 November 2016, Die Linke nominated him as a candidate in the 2017 federal presidential election. Butterwegge received 128 votes on 12 February 2017, coming in second place to former Vice Chancellor Frank-Walter Steinmeier of the SPD.

== Life ==
Christoph Butterwegge graduated from the Max Ludwig Planck grammar school in Dortmund in 1970 and studied social science, philosophy, law, and psychology and Ruhr-University Bochum. In 1975 he graduated with a degree in social science and in 1978 with an MA in philosophy. In 1980, he joined Detlev Albers at the University of Bremen with the dissertation SPD und Staat heute ("SPD and state today").

Butterwegge took lectures for sociology and social and political science in various universities and technical colleges in Duisburg, Fulda, Magdeburg, and Münster. From 1987 to 1989, he worked as a scientific employee at the Department of Education and Society at the University of Bremen. He also lectured at the academy for Labor and Politics as well as at the Research and Education Center for the History of the Workers Movement in the State of Bremen.

In 1990, at the University of Bremen, Butterwegge habilitated in the field of political science with a study on the theory and practice of Austrian social democracy. From 1991 to 1994, he worked as a research assistant at the Bremen Foundation for Arms Conversion and Peace Research. From 1994 to 1997, he represented a C-3 professorship for social policy at the Department of Social Sciences at the Potsdam University of Applied Sciences, where he was awarded a C-4 professorship for political science. Since 2011, Butterwegge has been the managing director of the Institute for Comparative Education and Social Services at the University of Cologne. Prominent former students of Butterwegge include Kemal Bozay, Thomas Gesterkamp, Gudrun, Hentges, Michael Klundt, and Samuel Salzborn.

Since May 2013, Butterwegge has written guest columns for FOCUS Online in addition to articles for ZEIT, Die Tageszeitung ("taz"), Frankfurter Rundschau, Freitag, the Mittelbayerische Zeitung, The Young World, and the Federal Center for Political Education.

He is married to social scientist and Die Linke politician Carolin Butterwegge. The couple have two children.

== Work ==
Butterwegge's work focused on the history of German social democracy as well as questions on the theory of state and democracy. At the beginning of the 1980s, Butterwegge began writing on Friedenspolitik (peace policy) and disarmament. He attempted to make use of the Zeitunsansatz in Bremen for political education, and linked it with concepts of "research learning" in the sense of a "search for a trace" as well as a local and regional historiography "from below", which was then related to oral history.

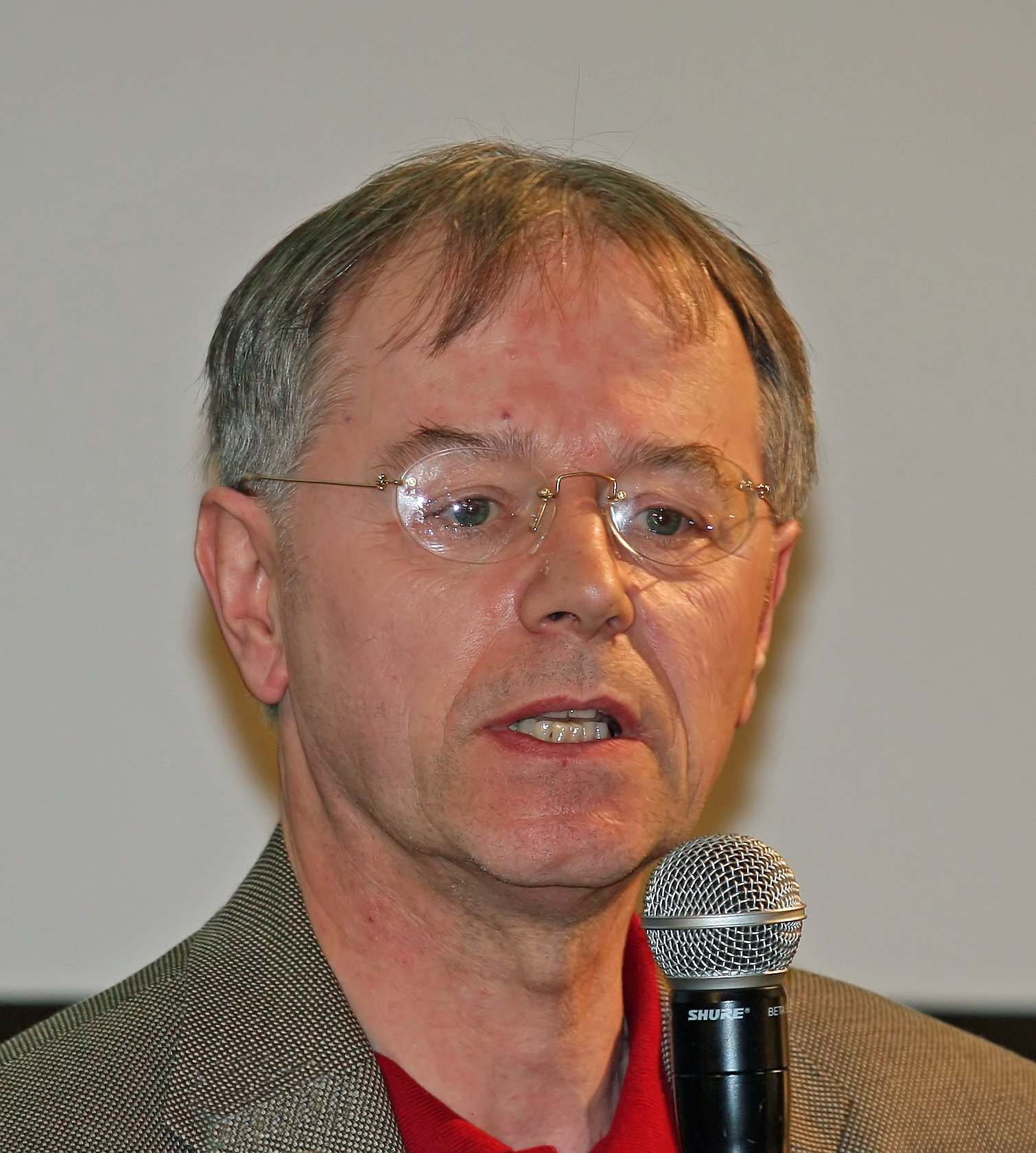
Butterwegge in 2009

Since 1990, Butterwegge has focused on the subjects of right-wing extremism, racism, youth violence, violence prevention, and migration policy. Other areas of work are globalization, neoliberalism, the welfare state, demographic change, poverty - particularly child and elderly poverty - as well as generational justice. For many years, Butterwegge has been publicly featured on various topics and has been interviewed by various newspapers, radio stations, and television station.

Butterwegge has argued that both globalization and demographic change have been abused to justify profound market-driven changes in society, such as the dismantling of the welfare state and a largely antisocial reform policy. In emphasizing the benefits of people, Butterwegge sees the danger of "ethnicizing social conflicts". The concept of location nationalism goes back to Butterwegge, which, in contrast to the well-known Volkisch nationalism of the far-right, means an over-identification with Germany as a business location.

== Political activity ==
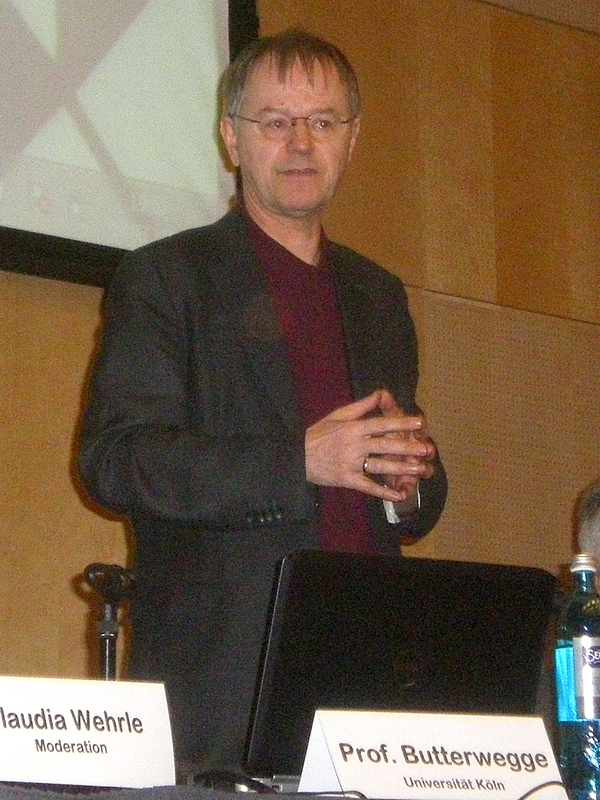
Butterwegge at a panel discussion on the subject of poverty in Germany (2013)

Butterwegge joined the Social Democratic Party in July 1970 and was active in the Dortmund branch of the Jusos, the SPD's youth organization. As a member of the Marxist-influenced Juso Left movement, he was elected as a member of the Juso district executive committee. In this position, Butterwegge was a vocal opponent of newly elected Chancellor and fellow party member Helmut Schmidt and accused him of undermining the interests of workers. In 1975, Butterwegge was expelled from the SPD. Butterwegge later documented and commented on the process that led to his explosion, as well as the motives for his involvement in the Jusos in his book Parteiordnungsverfahren in der SPD.

In 1983, shortly after the election of Helmut Kohl of the CDU as Chancellor, Butterwegge applied for readmission into the SPD. The process of readmission took several years and was completed on 1 January 1987 when future Chancellor Gerhard Schröder, who had worked with Butterwegge during his time in the Jusos, personally vouched for his readmission into the party.

Butterwegge was a staunch critic of the Kohl government and accused the CDU/CSU - FDP coalition of dismantling the social state. In 1998, he criticized the coalition government of the SPD and Alliance 90/The Greens, headed by Chancellor Gerhard Schröder, for not providing an alternative to neoliberal governance, and believed that their policy program had submitted to the interests of business. In 2005, due to his disillusionment with the SPD's choice to serve as junior members in a grand coalition government headed by Angela Merkel of the CDU, he left the party and justified his decision to leave the day. In a press conference in Cologne, he argued that the best interests of left-wing SPD supporters were served by voting for Party of Democratic Socialism or WASG.

Despite his lack of formal membership in the party, Butterwegge was initially considered by Die Linke to be their candidate In the German presidential election of 2012. After initially expressing interest, he bowed out in favor of Beate Klarsfeld, who was nominated instead. In the 2017 presidential election, he was chosen by Die Linke as their presidential candidate; he received 128 votes versus eventual winner Frank-Walter Steinmeier of the SPD, who received 931 votes.

== Positions ==
Over the course of Gerhard Schröder's tenure as Chancellor, Butterwegge grew more and more discontent with his party's conduct in government. Butterwegge was a staunch critic of the so-called Riester-Rente, a grant-aided privately funded pension scheme named after then-Minister of Labour and Social Affairs Walter Riester, as well as the provisions of the Agenda 2010 welfare reforms. Butterwegge derided said policies as neoliberal and argued that they would result in poorer conditions for the weakest in society: the poor, the elderly, the long-term unemployed, the mentally ill, and people with disabilities. He argued that neoliberalism was no longer an economic theory, but rather a social ideology that enables right-wing populism, nationalism, and racism.

Butterwegge has argued that, as former state responsibilities such as managing the education and penal system have been privatized and thus commodified, the power of the democratic state has been decreased relative to the power of the individual interests of private investors.

A staunch opponent of nationalism, Butterwegge decried what he saw as a resurgence of nationalism of racism in the "football patriotism" that dominated the 2006 FIFA World Cup. In a November 2011 interview with the Swiss weekly publication WOZ, Butterwegge asserted that there is a meaningful distinction between left-wing and right-wing extremism, arguing that the "quality of violence" found in acts of right-wing terrorism is far greater than that in acts of left-wing extremism.
