= Michel Cullin =

French political scientist (1944–2020)

Michel Cullin (17 September 1944 – 3 March 2020) was "Maître de conférences" at the University of Nice and director of French-Austrian relations at the Diplomatic Academy of Vienna.

== Life ==
Cullin was born in Paris. After he obtained his degrees in political science and German studies (1962–65) in Paris, Michel Cullin became "Assistant de français" at the "Theresianum-school" in Vienna (1966–1967). Between 1967 and 1969, he was "Lecteur de français" at the University of Vienna. After working at the Geschwister-Scholl-Institute and LMU Munich (1969–71) he became "Assistant d’allemand" (1971–76), "Maître- assistant de civilisation autrichienne" (1976–80) and later "Maître de conférences de civilisation autrichienne" (1980–82) at the University of Orléans.

In 1977, he obtained a doctoral degree in "études allemandes contemporaines" (1977). Furthermore, he worked as French correspondent for the ORF and was director of the "club franco-allemand" of Orléans. Between 1979 and 1982, he was researching on behalf of the "Deutsch-Französischen Jugendwerks" and two years later he joined the aid association of CEMEA. The following years, Cullin lived in Vienna and was director of the French institute (1982–1986) and guest professor at the University. He worked for several newspapers. He worked at Heidelberg University, Leipzig University, and the University of Jena, and was between 1991 and 1995 Cultural attaché for cooperation in higher education at the French embassy in Berlin. Between 1998 and 1999, he was "Maître de conférences" at the University of Nice. He was actively involved in politics.

Cullin was awarded the Austrian Cross of Honour for Science and Art in 1978. From 2008 onward, he represented France in the International Council of the Austrian Service Abroad with Beate Klarsfeld and supported especially the work of young Austrians in Holocaust Memorial Centers and Jewish museums worldwide. He died in Vienna.
