= Franco-German Youth Office =

Organization

- OFAJ / DFJW
- Founded: 1963
- Headquarters: Paris, France
- Secretary General: Pascale Trimbach, Tobias Bütow
- Budget: €38.5 million (2023)
- Staff: 70 (full-time equivalents)
- Website: fgyo.org

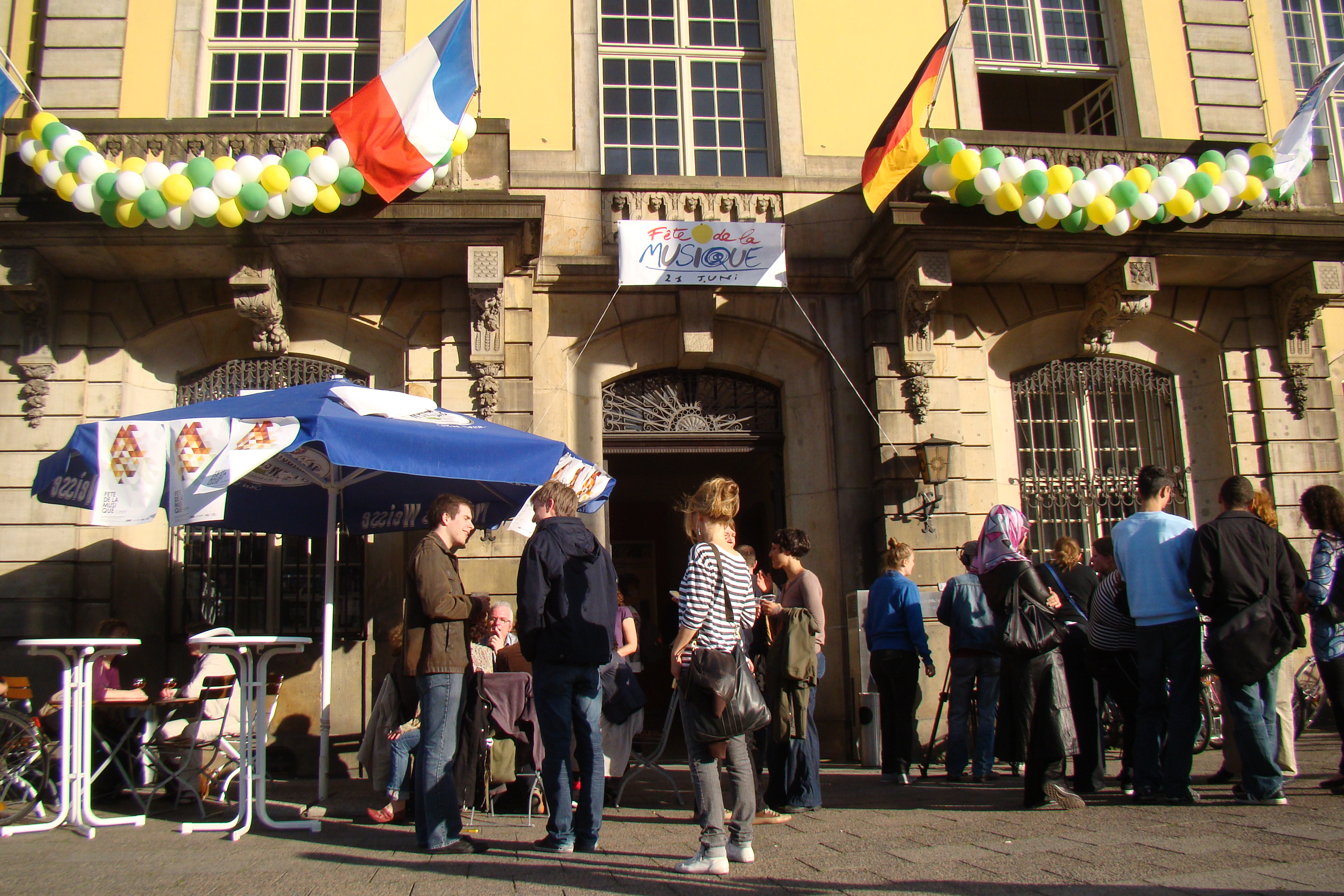
OFAJ office in Berlin on the annual Fête de la Musique in Berlin

The Franco-German Youth Office (FGYO; French: Office franco-allemand pour la Jeunesse, OFAJ; German: Deutsch-Französisches Jugendwerk, DFJW) is an organisation to subsidize programs for children, adolescents and young adults. Its main goal is to intensify the Franco-German relationships through cultural exchanges for young people, with the mission of "strengthening the bonds that unite French and German youth, increasing their mutual understanding and bringing about, encouraging and carrying out meetings and exchanges".

== History ==
The Youth Office was one of the first institutions created on the basis of the Élysée Treaty that was signed on January 22, 1963 in Paris. The FGYO's first initiative was organized in the summer of 1963, bringing together a few dozen French and Germans on the historic fields of Verdun.

The FGYO was originally headquartered in Rhöndorf near Bonn, then the West German capital. In December 2000, the last employees moved out from there. It is now headquartered in Paris, with its main German office in Berlin and a branch office, which opened in 2014, in Saarbrücken.

Since 1963 the organisation has financed projects for 10 million young Germans and French through participation in 400.000 exchange programs. The Franco-German Youth Office has facilitated leadership exchanges for youth organizations, as well as vocational internships and camps, town partnership, work camps, individual and family exchanges, sporting events, educational and linguistic programs, apprenticeships, and more. In 2023 it organised 7,406 events with about 188,000 participants.

== Funding ==
The FGYO's funding has been increased in decisions made by the annual Franco-German Ministerial Council. It is considered to have contributed to ending the centuries of French–German enmity. The organisation is responsible for administering the Franco-German Citizen Fund (German: Bürgerfonds, French: fonds citoyen). On January 22, 2019, the two governments further strengthened its role by increasing its budget to almost EUR 30 million through the Treaty of Aachen.

== See also ==
- Franco-German high schools
- Franco-German University and Erasmus Programme
- Interrail Youth Pass
- Confederation of European Journeymen Associations
