= 2017 German presidential election =

- 12 February 2017

1260 members of the Federal Convention 631 votes needed to win
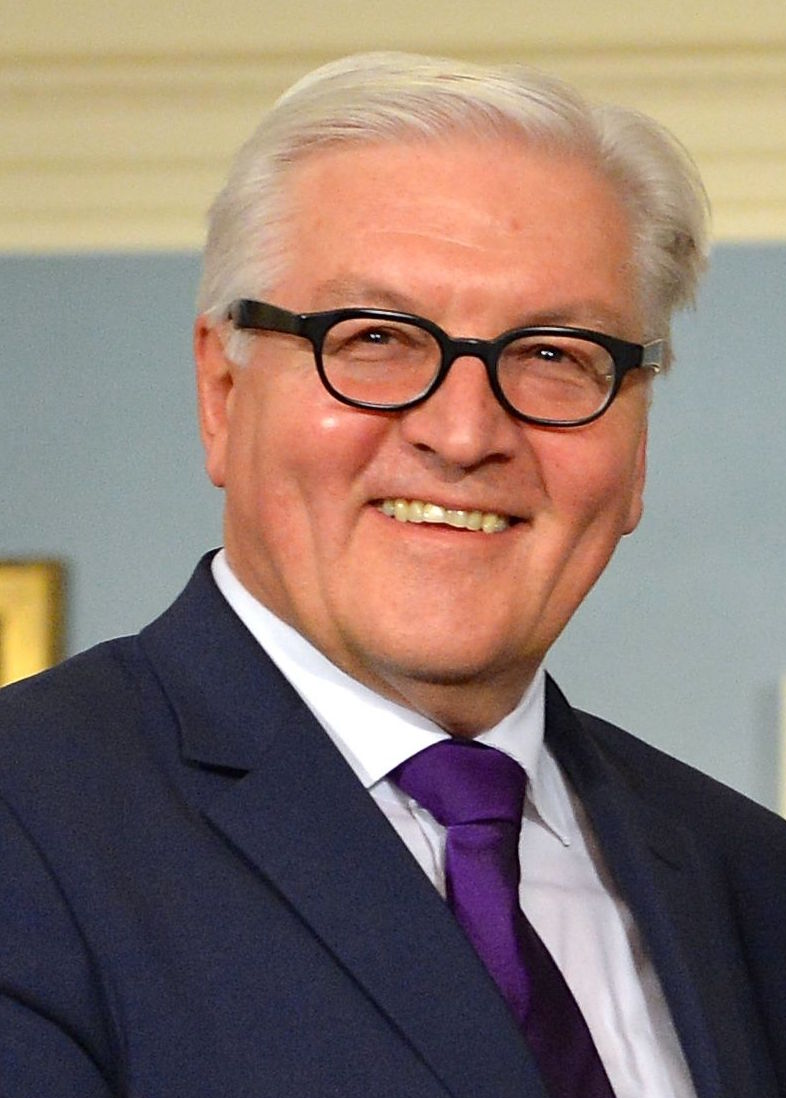

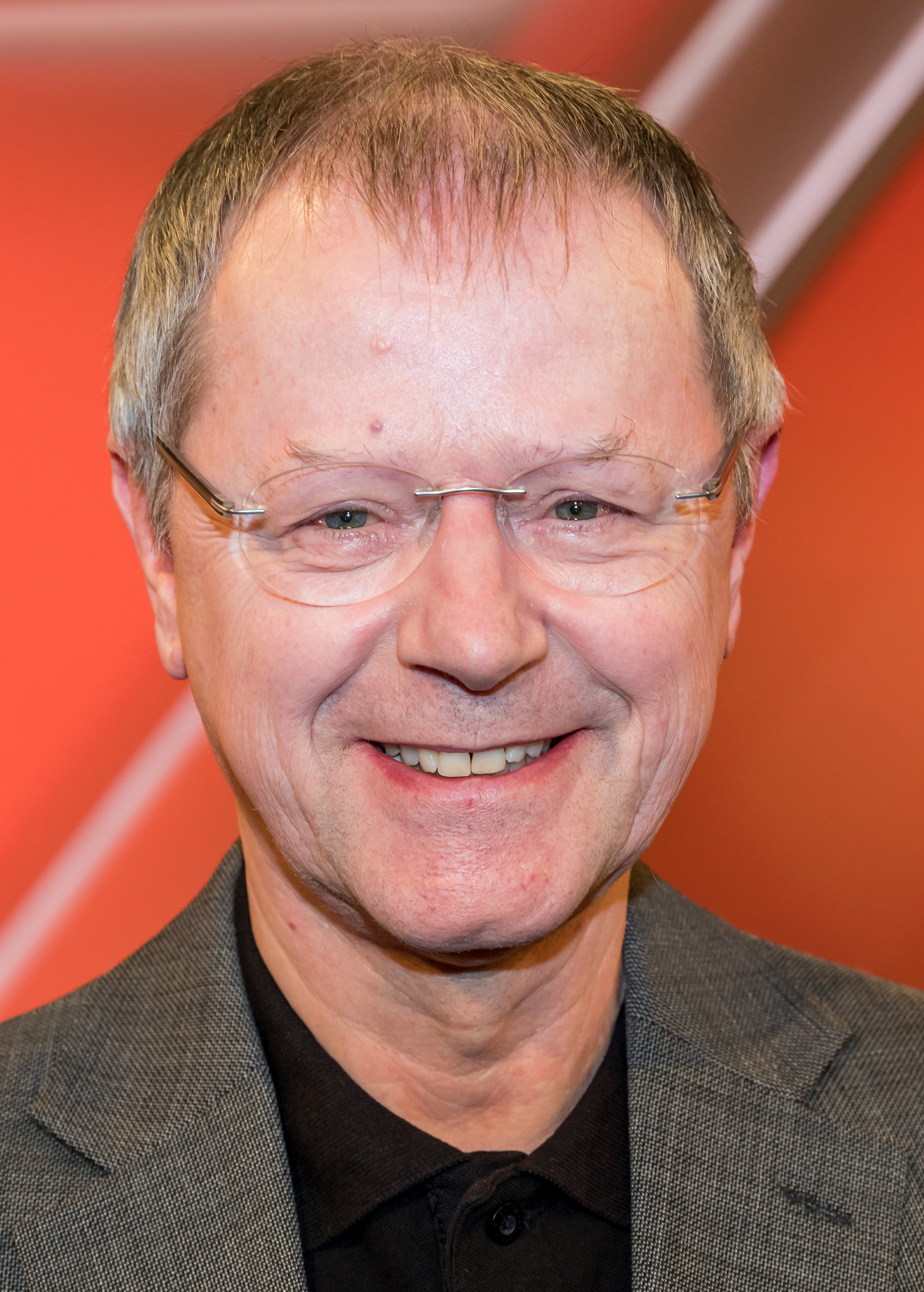
Nominee	Frank-Walter Steinmeier	Christoph Butterwegge
Party	SPD	Independent
Electoral vote	931	128
Percentage	73.89%	10.16%
Nominators	SPD, CDU/CSU, Grüne, FDP, SSW	Die Linke
President before election
Joachim Gauck
Independent
Elected President
Frank-Walter Steinmeier
SPD

An indirect presidential election (officially the 16th Federal Convention) was held on 12 February 2017 to elect the 12th President of Germany. Incumbent President Joachim Gauck announced on 6 June 2016 that he would not stand for re-election, citing his advancing age.

The President is elected by the Federal Convention, an electoral body that consists of all members of the current Bundestag and an equal number of electors, who are elected by the sixteen state parliaments. Frank-Walter Steinmeier of the Social Democratic Party was chosen as the single candidate of the ruling coalition in November 2016; with the Christian Democratic Union choosing not to field a candidate against him, his election was seen as guaranteed. Steinmeier was elected on the first ballot, and took office on 19 March 2017.

== Composition of the Federal Convention ==
The Bundesversammlung was composed as follows:

Party	Bundestag members	State electors	Total electors	Percentage
CDU/CSU	309	230	539	42.8%
SPD	193	191	384	30.5%
Grüne	63	84	147	11.6%
Die Linke	64	31	95	7.5%
FDP	0	36	36	2.9%
AfD	0	35	35	2.8%
Piraten	0	11	11	0.9%
Freie Wähler	0	10	10	0.8%
SSW	0	1	1	0.1%
BVB/Freie Wähler	0	1	1	0.1%
Total	630	630	1260	100%

Composition of the Federal convention (party-line) Die Linke: 95 SPD: 384 Grüne: 147 Piraten: 11 SSW: 1 BVB/Freie Wähler: 1 Freie Wähler: 10 FDP: 36 CDU/CSU: 539 AfD: 35 Independent: 1

In the Federal Convention, a candidate needs a majority (at least 631 votes) to become President. If no candidate gets a majority of votes in the first two ballots, a plurality is sufficient on the third ballot.

== Candidates ==
Every member of the Federal Convention (members of the Bundestag and state electors, once they are elected by their respective state parliament) can propose candidates for the presidency. It is required that the President be a German citizen and at least 40 years old. Every candidate has to declare their consent to running. Candidates can be proposed before the Federal Convention and (theoretically) during the Convention before every ballot. If the President-elect is a member of a legislature or a government on federal or state level, he has to resign from that office before the start of their term. A sitting president is not allowed to run for a third consecutive term.

Chancellor Angela Merkel originally wanted to nominate Green politician Marianne Birthler, who succeeded Gauck as the Federal Commissioner for the Stasi Records from 2001 to 2011, and as the CDU/CSU and the Greens control a majority in the Federal Convention, Birthler's election would have been secured. However, Birthler after some time decided not to run.

On 14 November 2016 the governing parties CDU/CSU and the Social Democratic Party named the Minister of Foreign Affairs and former Vice Chancellor of Germany Frank-Walter Steinmeier as their consensus candidate. Alliance 90/The Greens and the Free Democratic Party endorsed Steinmeier. In any case Steinmeier was the clear favorite to win the election, because the parties endorsing his candidacy held more than 1000 votes in the Federal Convention.

Alternative for Germany proposed the former treasurer of Frankfurt Albrecht Glaser, and the Free Voters named the judge and TV celebrity Alexander Hold. Both were widely considered to have no real chance of winning the presidency, because their respective parties had few electors in the Federal Convention and it was unlikely that they would receive endorsements from other parties. On 20 November 2016 The Left nominated political scientist Christoph Butterwegge. Martin Sonneborn, member of the satirical party Die PARTEI and state elector (North Rhine-Westphalia) for the Pirate Party proposed his father, the retired career consultant Engelbert Sonneborn.

Candidate		Party	Supporting party	Office(s) held
Christoph Butterwegge	Christoph Butterwegge (66)	Independent	The Left	None
Albrecht Glaser	Albrecht Glaser (75)	Alternative for Germany	AfD	Treasurer of Frankfurt am Main (1997–2001) Other offices: Mayor of Waldbronn from 1980 to 1987; Mayor of Bretten until 1980
Alexander Hold	Alexander Hold (54)	Free Voters	FW; BVB/FW	Member of the city council of Kempten (2008–present)
	Engelbert Sonneborn (79)	Independent	Pirates	None
Frank-Walter Steinmeier	Frank-Walter Steinmeier (61)	Social Democratic Party	SPD; CDU/CSU; Alliance '90/The Greens; FDP; SSW	Minister of Foreign Affairs (2005–2009; 2013–2017) Other offices: Vice Chancellor of Germany from 2007 to 2009; Leader of the SPD Group in the Bundestag from 2009 to 2013; Leader of the Social Democratic Party in 2008; Head of the German Chancellery from 1999 to 2005; Member of the Bundestag from 2009 to 2017

Except for Sonneborn, all candidates were electors in the Federal Convention themselves. Steinmeier was a member of the current Bundestag, Butterwegge and Glaser were elected as state electors for Saxony and Hold as state elector for Bavaria.

== Results ==
The 16th Federal Convention elected Frank-Walter Steinmeier on the first ballot. He entered office on 19 March 2017.

Result of the vote Butterwegge Sonneborn Steinmeier Hold Glaser Abstentions/Invalid

Candidate	Party	Supporting party	First	
Candidate	Party	Supporting party	Votes	%
Frank-Walter Steinmeier	Social Democratic Party	SPD, CDU/CSU, Alliance '90/The Greens, FDP and SSW	931	73.89
Christoph Butterwegge	Independent	The Left	128	10.16
Albrecht Glaser	Alternative for Germany	AfD	42	3.33
Alexander Hold	Free Voters	Free Voters and BVB/FW	25	1.98
Engelbert Sonneborn	Independent	Pirates and Die PARTEI	10	0.79
Abstentions			103	8.17
Invalid votes			14	0.11
Total			1,253	99.44
Eligible voters			1,260	100
