= Wandering journeyman =

Time of travel following apprenticeship

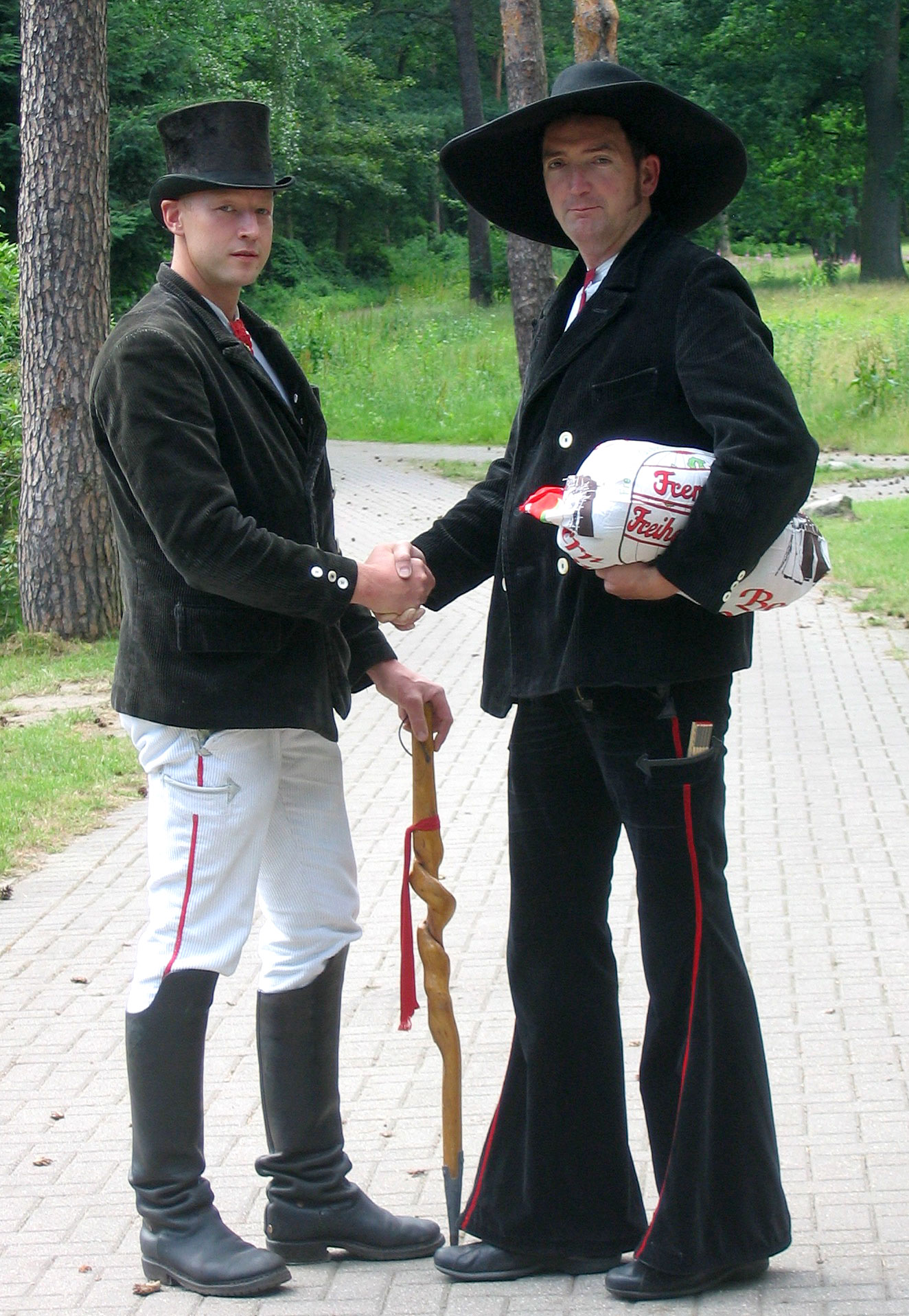
Journeymen in traditional dress

In the European apprenticeship tradition, the wandering years (Wanderjahre, also known in German as Wanderschaft, Gesellenwanderung, and colloquially sometimes referred to as Walz, lit. 'waltz') is a time of travel for several years after completing apprenticeship as a craftsman. The tradition dates back to medieval times and is still alive in France and the German-speaking countries. Normally three years and one day is the minimum period for a wandering journeyman. Crafts and trades in which that tradition persists to the current day, include roofing, metalworking, woodcarving, carpentry and joinery, millinery and musical instrument manufacture (including organ building).

In the Middle Ages and Renaissance, when the guild system still controlled the professions and trades in the visual arts, the Wanderjahre was also taken by painters, mason-architects and goldsmiths; and it was important for the transmission of artistic style around Europe. The development of late modern nations and their borders within Europe did not have much effect on the journeyman tradition until the 19th century.

== Historic roots ==
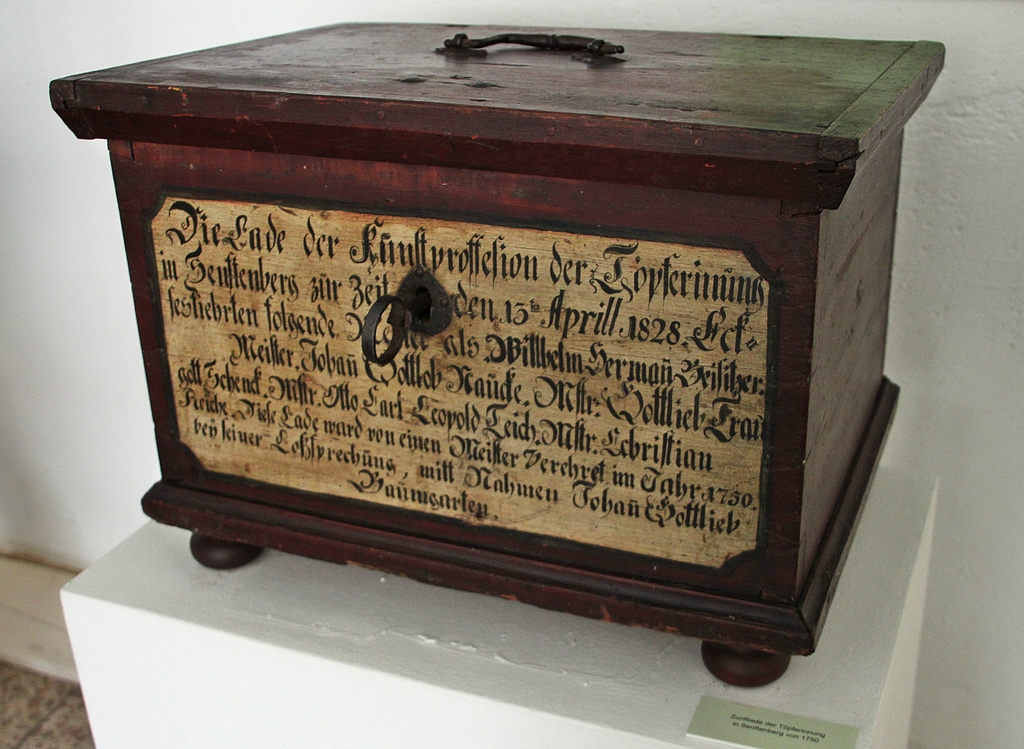
Guild chest of the potters in Senftenberg (1750)

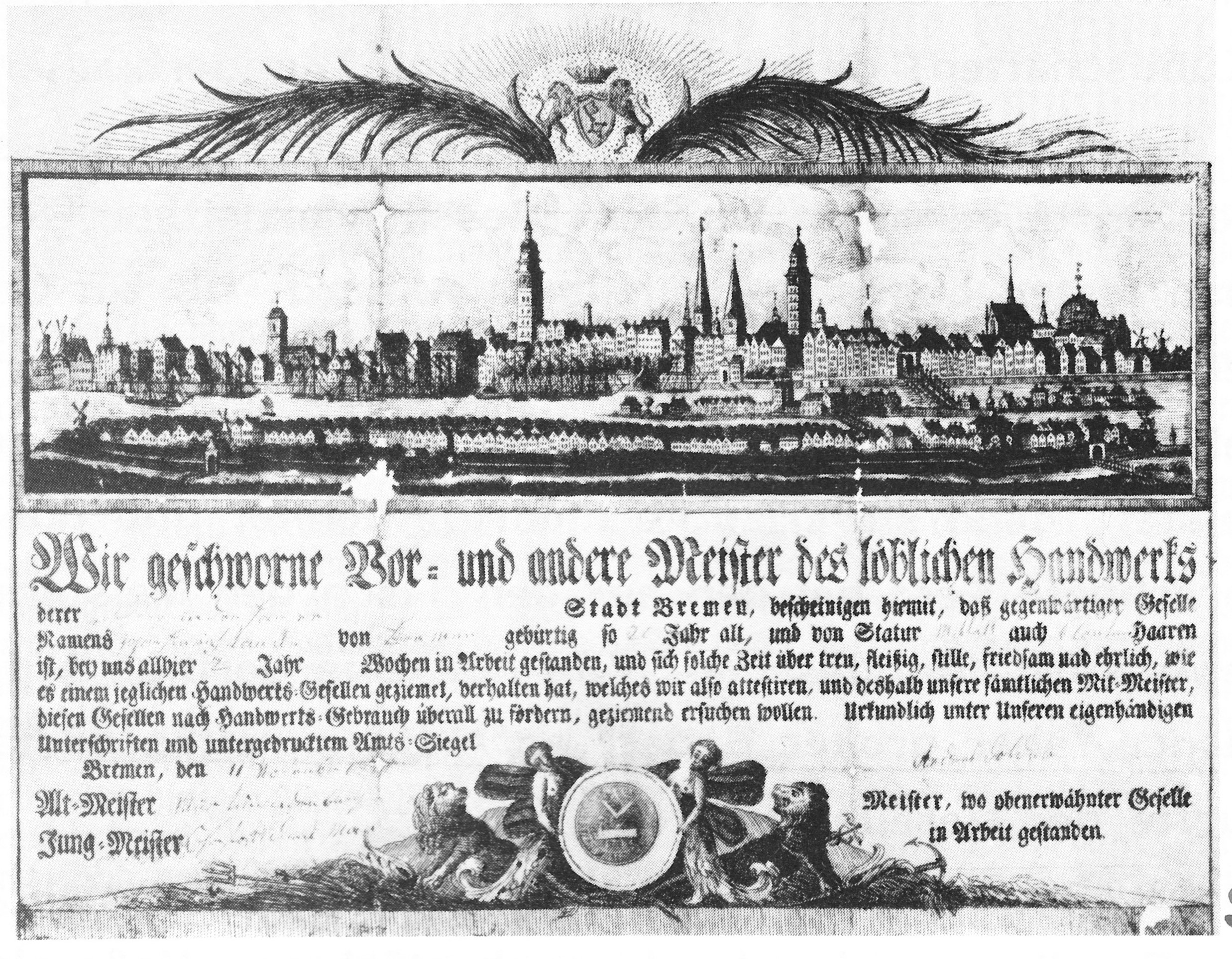
A Kundschaft certificate for a carpenter leaving Bremen in 1818

In medieval times, the guild system bound an apprentice to his master for a number of years. The apprentice lived with the master as a member of the household, receiving most or all of his/her compensation in the form of food and lodging; in Germany, an apprentice normally had to pay a fee (known in German as Lehrgeld) for his or her apprenticeship. After the years of apprenticeship (Lehrjahre), the apprentice was absolved from his/her obligations (this absolution was known as a Freisprechung). The guilds, however, would not allow a young craftsman without experience to be promoted to master – apprentices could only choose to be employed, although many of them preferred to travel around instead.

Until craftsmen became masters, they would only be paid by the day (the term "journeyman" relates to the French word journée, meaning the time span of a day). In parts of Europe, such as in later medieval Germany, moving from one town to another to gain experience of different workshops became an important part of the training of a journeyman (Geselle) who aspired to become a master. Some carpenters in Germany have retained the tradition of travelling journeymen even today, although only a small minority still practice it.

In the Middle Ages, the number of years spent travelling differed according to the craft. Only after half of the required travelling years (Wanderjahre) would the journeyman register with a guild for the right to train up as a master. After completing the travelling years, he would settle in a workshop of the guild and after toughing it out for several more years (Mutjahre, "years of spirit[edness]/determination"), he would be allowed to produce a "masterpiece" (German: Meisterstück) and to present it to the guild. With their consent he would be promoted to guild master and as such be allowed to open his own guild-workshop in town.

The development of social-contract theories resulted in a system of subscriptions and certificates. When arriving in a new town the journeyman would be pointed to a survey master (Umschaumeister) or to a survey companion (Umschaugeselle). He would be given a list of workshops to present himself to find work (Umschau literally means 'look-around'). If unable to find work, the travelling journeyman would be given a small amount of money (Zehrgeld, "subsistence money") – enough to sustain his travel to the next town. Otherwise, he might get a place in a guild hostel (Gesellenherberge). His name would be added to the guild chest (Zunftlade) along with a declaration of how long he would be bound to the master, usually for half a year. Both sides could rescind that subscription (Einschreibung) at any time. The subscription of a new companion commonly became the occasion of a big carousal among the other bound journeymen in the town.

On the travelling journeyman's departure, the guild would hand over a certificate (Kundschaft) telling of the work achievements and certifying the journeyman's proper conduct and the orderly ending of the subscription. It would be hard to find a new subscription in the next town without it, but in reality, masters did often complain about journeymen running away. Many guild hostels had a black board recording the names of such absconders – along with the debts they had left behind. The certificates were hand-written until about 1730, when printed forms evolved with places to fill in details. By about 1770 the forms started to carry a copperplate print of the cityscape. The certificates were often large and unhandy, so that smaller travelling books replaced them by about 1820. This practice coincided with the establishment of modern police in Europe after the coalition wars (1803–1815) against Napoleon. The guild chest was replaced by state offices to keep registers. In some places the guilds were even banned from maintaining registers.

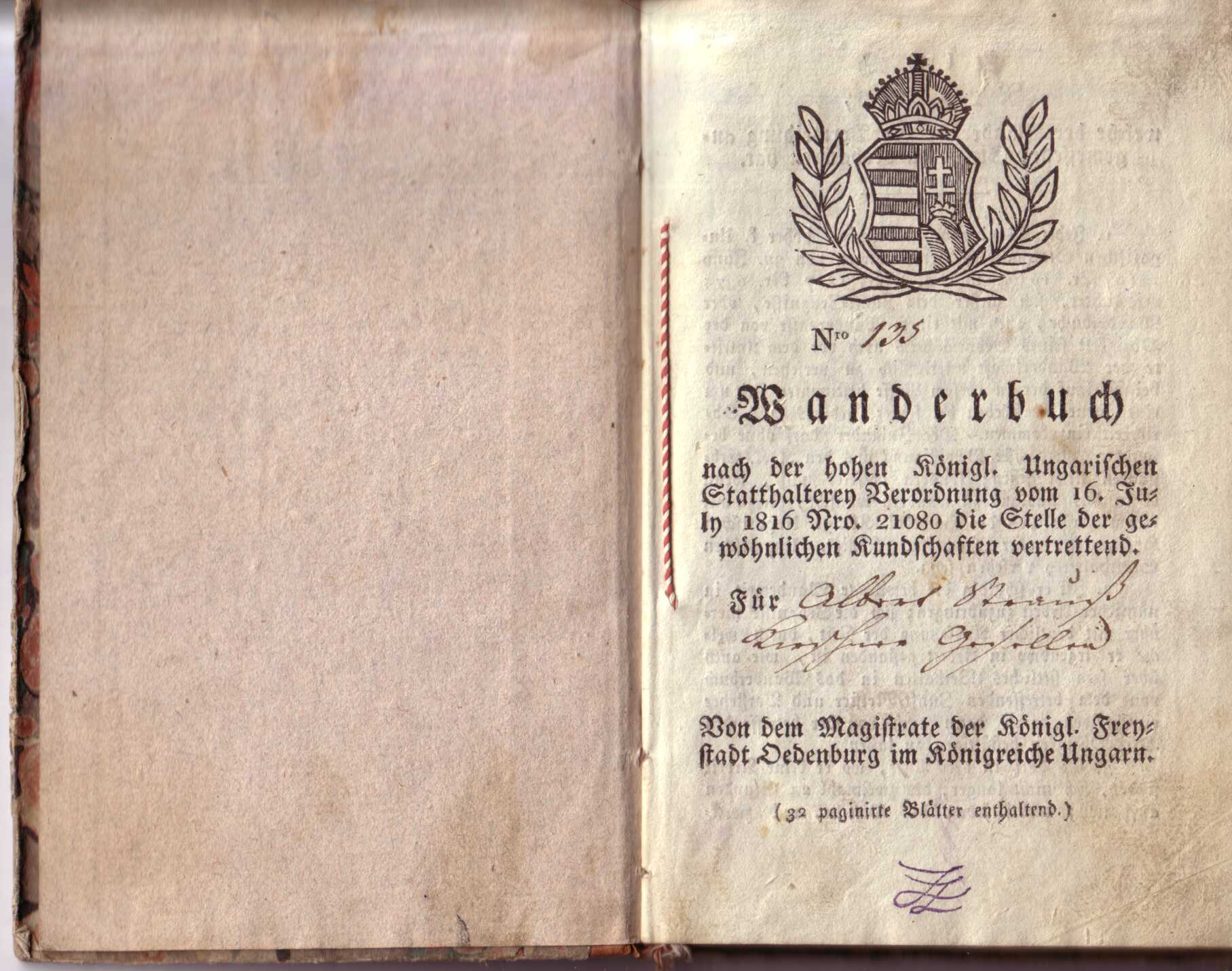
Travelling book (or Wanderbuch) of a German furrier named Albert Strauß in the Kingdom of Hungary of the Habsburg Monarchy in the year 1816

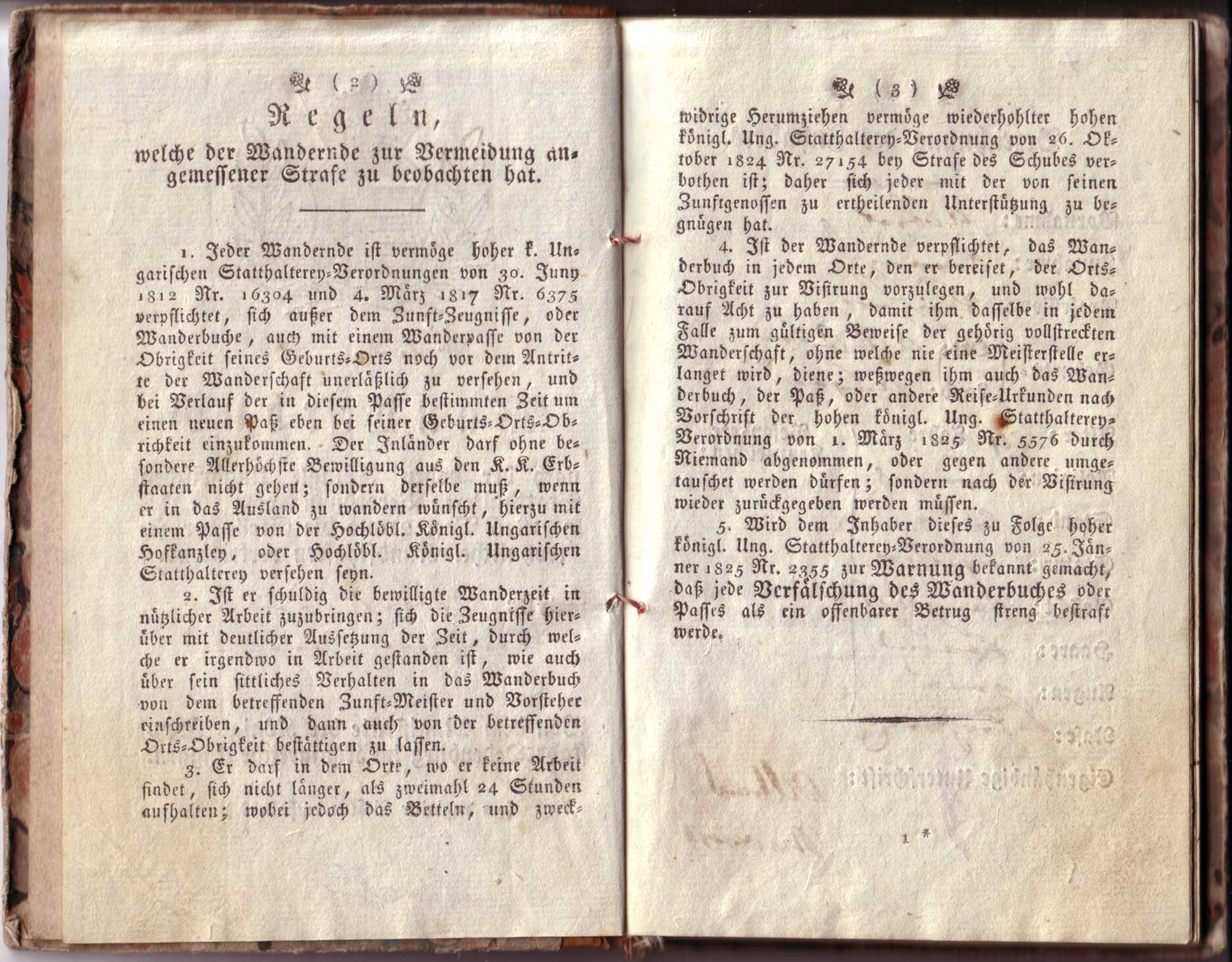
A travelling book of Albert Strauß: Regeln, welche der Wandernde zur Vermeidung angemessener Strafe zu beobachten hat ('Rules, which the journeyman must observe to avoid proper punishment').

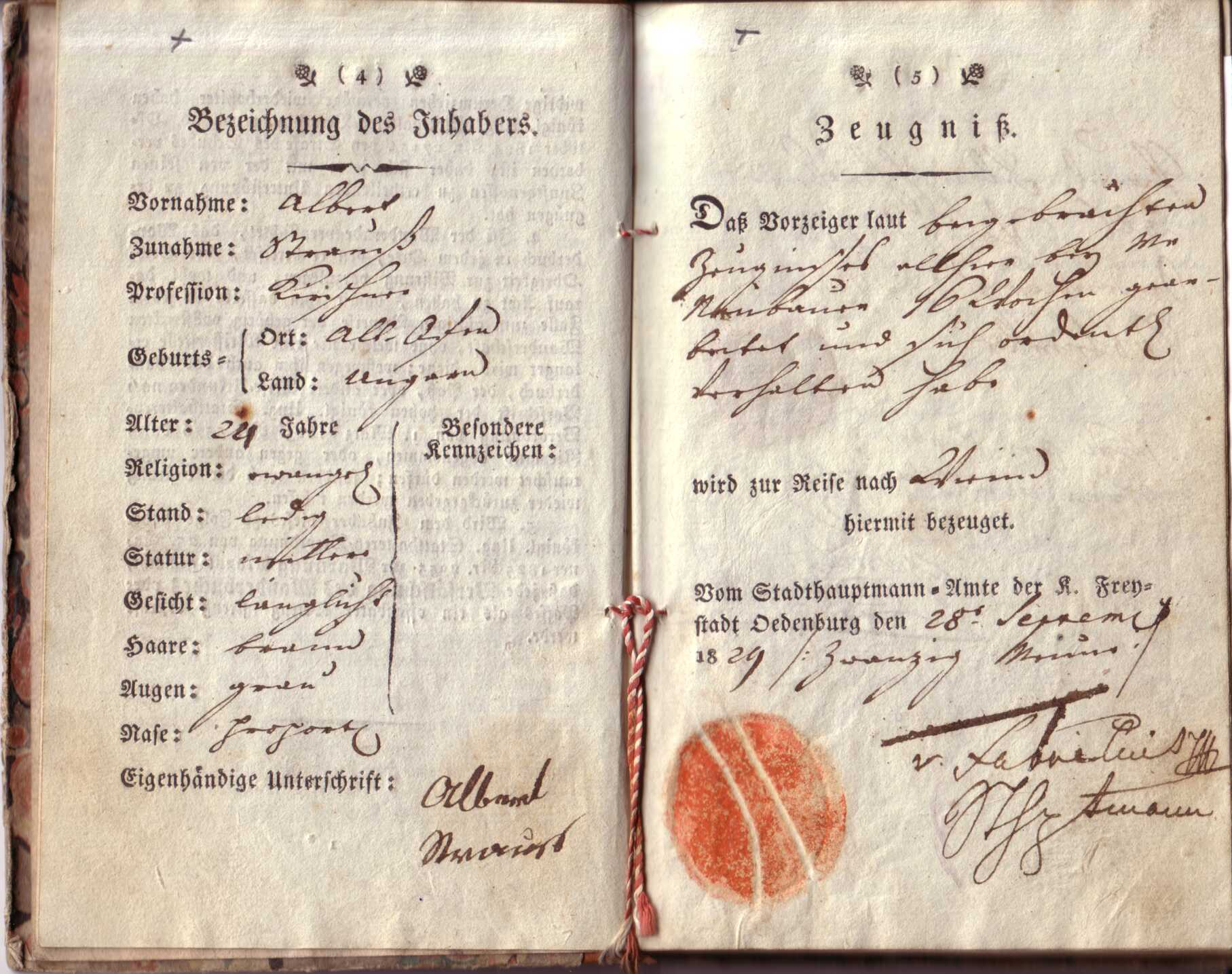
A travelling book of Albert Strauß: Bezeichnung des Inhabers ('description of the owner').

Sociologically, one may see the Wanderjahre as recapitulating a nomadic phase of human societal development. See also Rumspringa.

The traveler books or Wanderbücher are an important research-source that show migration paths in the early period of industrialisation in Europe. Travelling journeymen's paths often show boundaries of language and religion that hindered travel of craftsmen "on the Walz".

== Germany ==
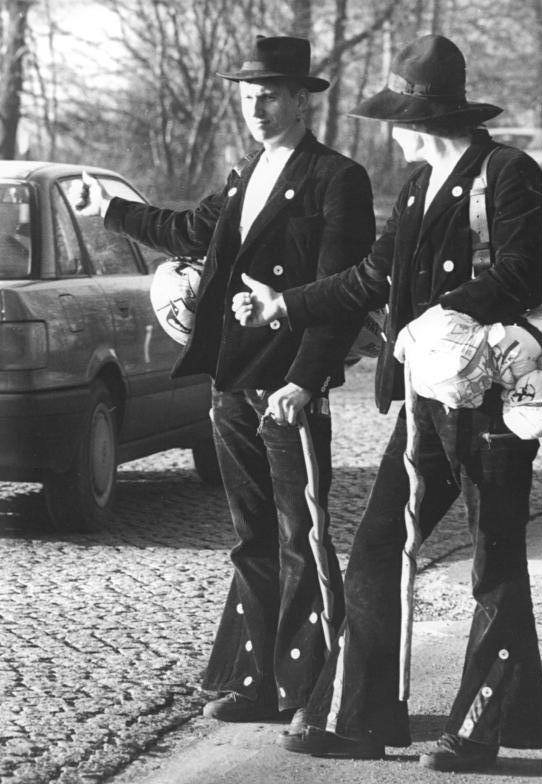
Carpenters "on the Walz", 1990

The tradition of the journeyman's travelling years (auf der Walz sein) persisted well into the 1920s in German-speaking countries, but was set back by multiple events like Nazis allegedly banning the tradition, the postwar German economic boom making it seem to be too much of a burden, and in East Germany the lack of opportunities for work in an economic system based on Volkseigener Betrieb. Beginning in the late 1980s, renewed interest in tradition in general together with economic changes (especially after the fall of the Berlin Wall) have caused the tradition to gain wider acceptance. The tradition was brought back to life mostly unchanged from the medieval concept since the journeyman brotherhoods (Schächte) never ceased to exist (including a Confederation of European Journeymen Associations).

The journeyman brotherhoods have established a standard to ensure that wandering journeymen are not mistaken for tramps and vagabonds. The journeyman is required to be unmarried, childless and debt-free—so that the journeyman years will not be taken as a chance to run away from social obligations. In modern times the brotherhoods often require a police clearance. Additionally, journeymen are required to wear a specific uniform (Kluft) and to present themselves in a clean and friendly manner in public. This helps them to find shelter for the night and a ride to the next town.

The travelling journeyman carries a log book (Wanderbuch) and in each new town goes to the town office asking for a stamp. This qualifies as a record of his travels and also replaces the residence registration that would otherwise be required. In contemporary brotherhoods, the Walz is required to last at least three years and one day (sometimes two years and one day). During the wandering years, the journeyman is not allowed to return within a perimeter of 50 km (30 miles) of his home town, except in specific emergency situations, such as the impending death of an immediate relative (parents and siblings).

At the beginning of the travels, the wanderer takes only a small, fixed sum of money with him (exactly five Deutsche Marks was common, now five euros); at its end, he should come home with exactly the same sum of money in his pocket. Thus, he is supposed neither to squander money nor to store up any riches during the journey, which should be undertaken only for the experience.

There are secret signs, such as specific, involved handshakes, that German carpenters traditionally use to identify each other. This is another traditional method to protect the trade against impostors. While less necessary in an age of telephones, identity cards and official diplomas, the signs are still retained as a tradition. Teaching them to anybody who has not successfully completed a carpenter apprenticeship is still considered very wrong, even though it is no longer a punishable crime today.

As of 2023, there were about 800 journeymen "on the Walz", either associated with a brotherhood or "running free". While the great majority are still male, young women are no longer unheard of on the Walz today.

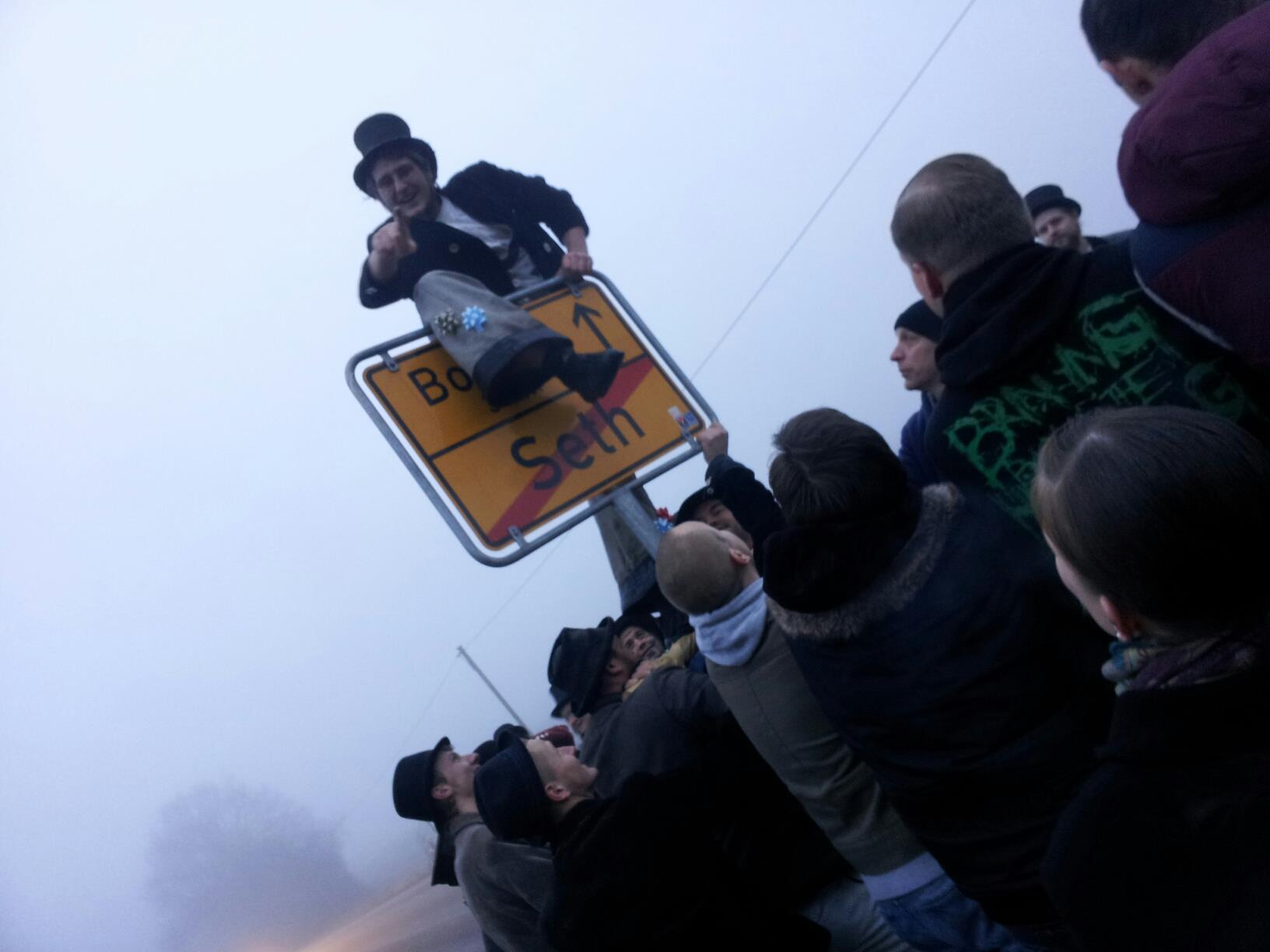
A journeyman climbing a town sign, celebrating his return home, as his friends and family welcome him

The wandering years include traditional events such as regional meetups where people share their stories and recommendations for good companies to visit. The biggest celebrations for each journeyman are the leaving day and the day he returns home, three years and a day later by traditional rule.

== Wandering journeymen's uniform in Germany ==
Wandering journeymen can be easily recognised on the street by their clothing. The carpenter's black hat has a broad brim; some professions use a black stovepipe hat or a cocked hat. The carpenters wear black corduroy bell-bottoms and a waistcoat and carry the Stenz, which is a traditional curled hiking pole. The clothes are made to be practical and sturdy for travelling and work – the hat protects from the sun, wide-legged trousers are easier to roll up and keep sawdust away from the socks and shoes, the pockets are made to fit a basic set of tools for the given trade.

Since many professions have since converted to the uniform of the carpenters, many people in Germany believe that only carpenters go travelling, which is untrue – since the carpenter's uniform is best known and well received, it simply eases the journey. Since wandering journeymen often travel by hitchhiking, the traditional outfit helps them find people who are willing to exchange a ride or a meal for a story from their travels.

The uniform is completed with a golden earring and golden bracelets—which could be sold in hard times and in the Middle Ages could be used to pay the gravedigger if any wanderer should die on the road.

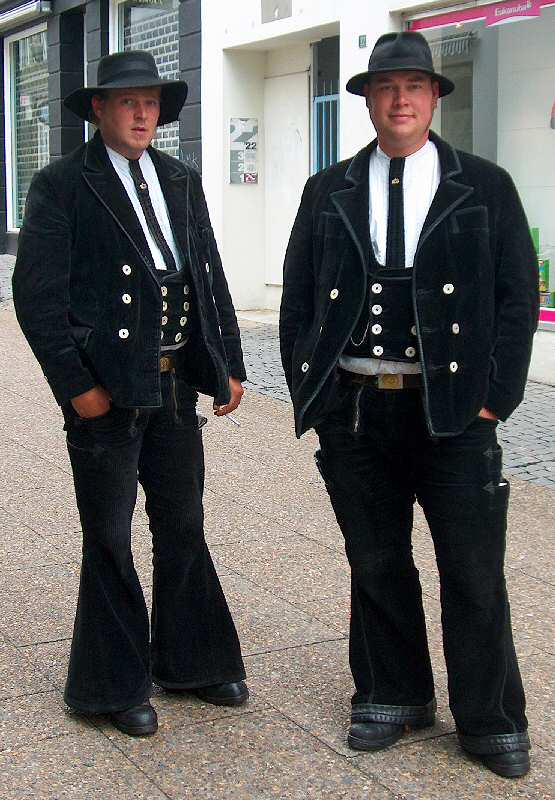
Wandering journeymen in Århus, Denmark

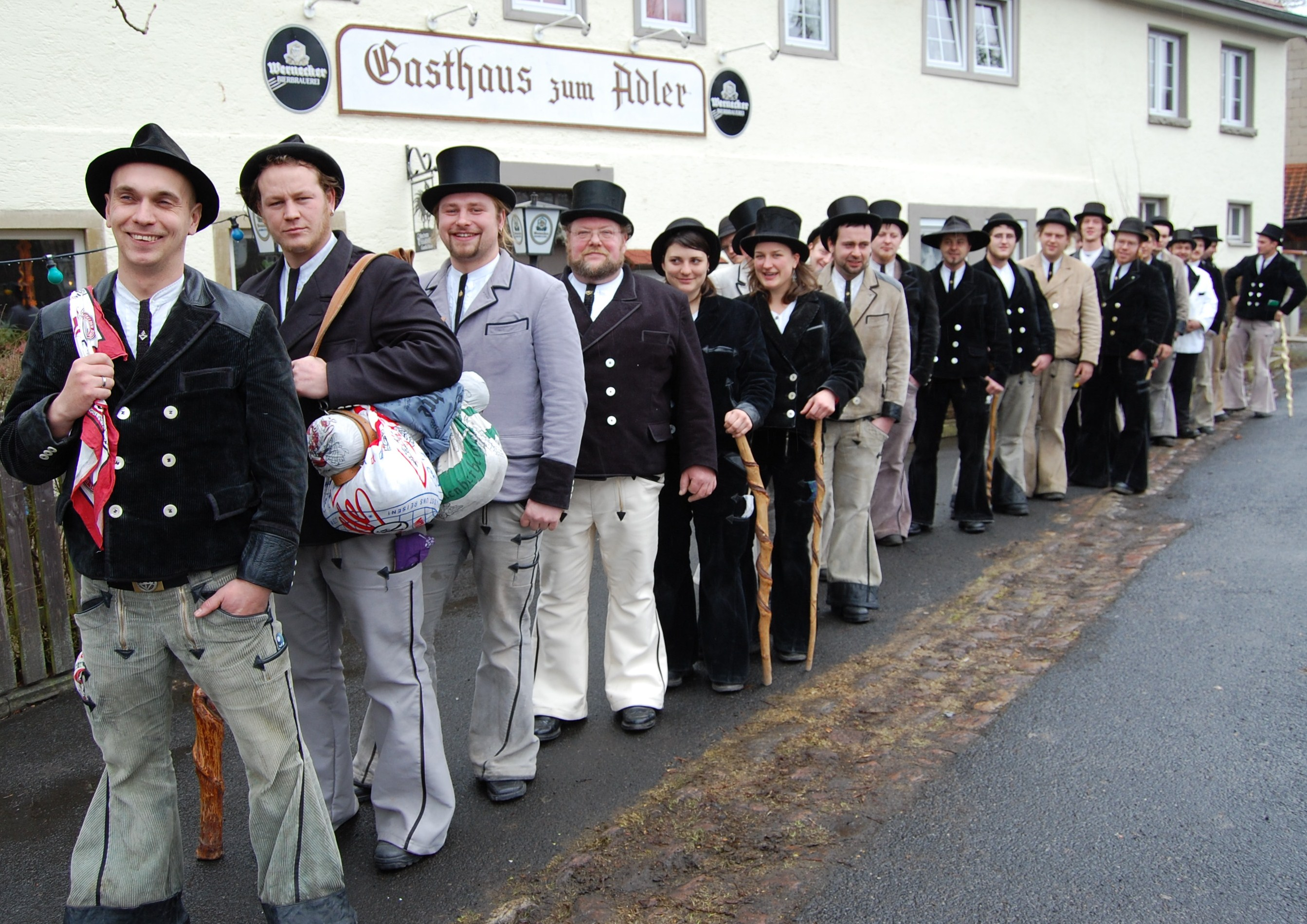
Wandering journeymen in Bad Kissingen (2010)

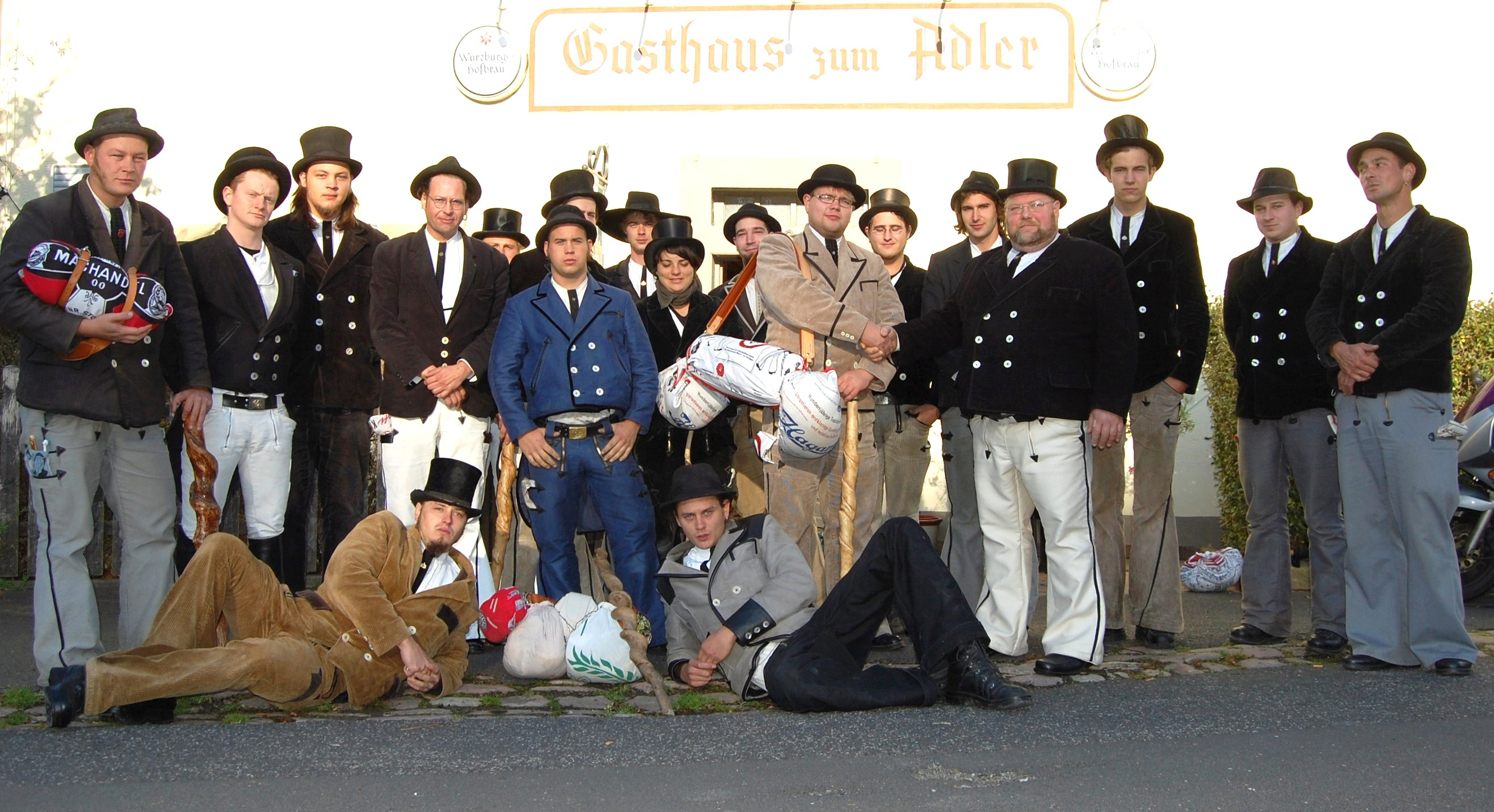
Wandering journeyman (2011)

== In other fields ==
While the institution of the travelling years is original to craftsmen, the concept has spread to other professions. Hence a priest could set out on an extended journey to do research in the libraries of monasteries across Europe and gain wider knowledge and experience.

== In the arts ==
- The Australian song "Waltzing Matilda" is thought by Pearce to be based on the journeyman's Walz., but see the Wikipedia entry for Swagman, which equates swagmen with Hobos in the US.
- There are many wanderer songs based on the Walz experience.
- Gustav Mahler composed Lieder eines fahrenden Gesellen, 'Songs of a wandering apprentice'
- Goethe's novel Wilhelm Meisters Wanderjahre (Wilhelm Meister's Travelling Years)
- Schubert's song cycle Die schöne Müllerin is about an apprentice miller and how he fared at a mill where he stays to work and falls in love with the miller's daughter.
- Reinhard Mey's song "Drei Jahre und ein Tag" is about the wandering years.
- In the videogame Pentiment the main character, Andreas, is finishing his Wanderjahre as the game begins.

== Well-known journeymen ==
The following people are known to have completed the traditional wandering-journeyman years:

- August Bebel (turner) – founder of the Social Democratic Party of Germany
- Jakob Böhme (shoemaker) – mystic and Christian philosopher
- Albrecht Dürer (painter) – German copperplate engraver and painter, later famous artist
- Friedrich Ebert (saddlemaker) – first president of the Weimar Republic
- Adam Opel (mechanic) – maker of sewing machines and bicycles. In the following generation his firm became known for car making
- Wilhelm Pieck (carpenter) – first president of East Germany

== See also ==
- Association of Journeymen
- Gap year
