= Sonderzüge in den Tod =

Sonderzüge in den Tod is the title of a touring exhibition commemorating the deportation of hundreds and thousands of people by the former Reichsbahn to the concentration- and extermination camps. It was shown in France in 2006 and, in a different form, in Germany in 2008. The exhibition was mostly located at railway stations.

== History and concept of the exhibition ==
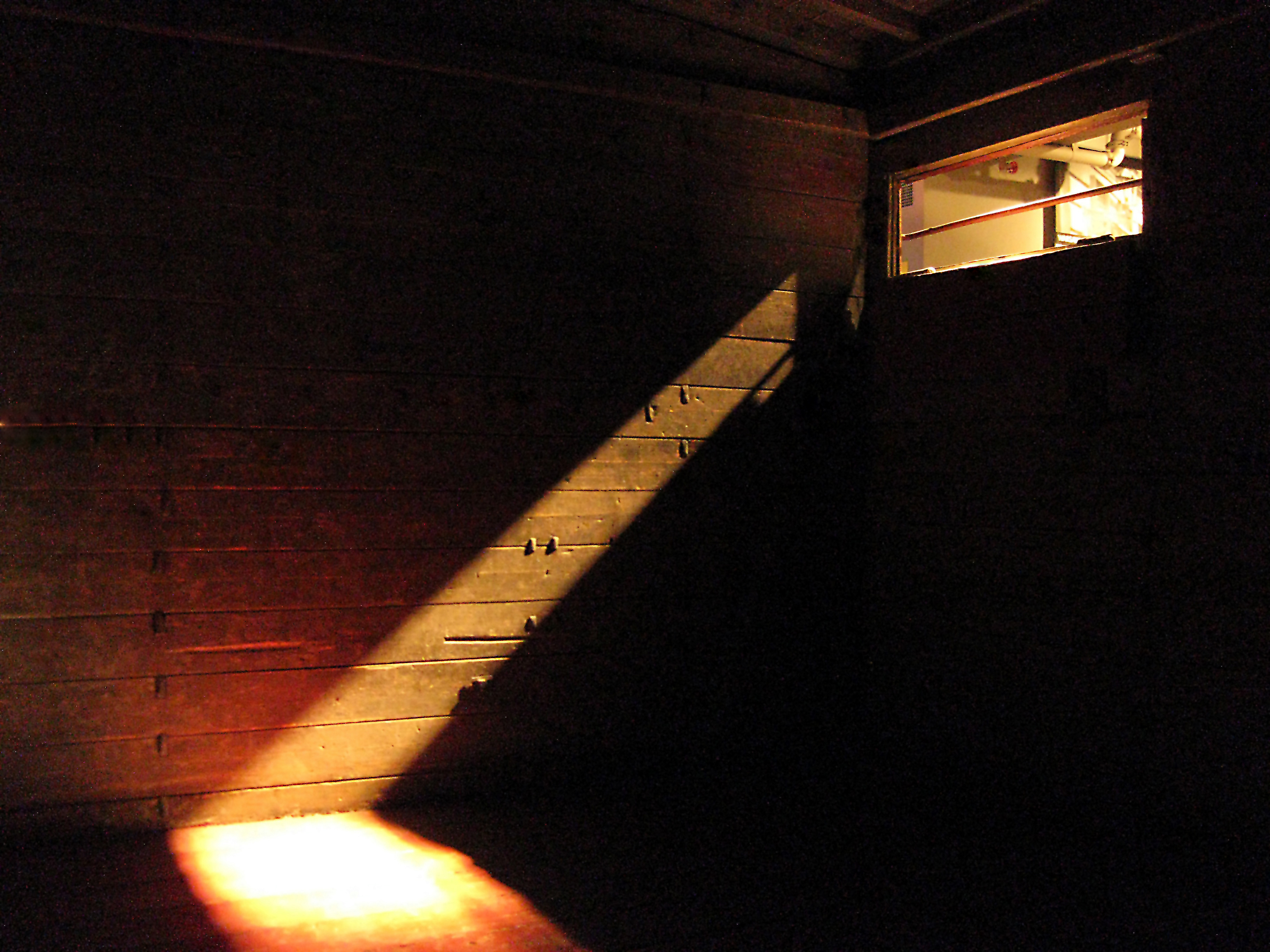
Interior of a covered goods wagon used to transport Jews and other Holocaust victims during World War II, the United States Holocaust Memorial Museum in Washington, D.C.

In Germany, the exhibition was opened on 23 January 2008 on the mezzanine floor of the Berlin Potsdamer Platz railway station. It was subsequently located at the central railway station at Halle (Saale). Between 28 March and 10 April, it was at the central railway station at Schwerin. It was at Wittemberge until 12 May and from 18 May to 15 June at the central railway station at Münster. Stop-overs in Cologne, Frankfurt, Dresden and Munich followed. From the 14 to 26 November, it was at the central railway station at Mannheim. The Deutsche Bahn estimated that by April 2008, 30,000 people had visited the exhibition. For the year 2008, around 80,000 visitors were expected. In 2009, the exhibition was planned to continue and be lent to cities which were interested. The first location was Hanau in January 2009. From 22 January, it was at Chemnitz, from 15 February at the Jewish Museum in Dorsten.

The exhibition was designed by the Deutsche Bahn in cooperation with Beate and Serge Klarsfeld together with a citizen's initiative, and included elements of the exhibition Enfants juifs déportés de France, which was shown for over three years in railway stations of the French SNCF. 15 of the 40 information boards are based on the collection of the French exhibition.

== Discourse on the exhibition ==
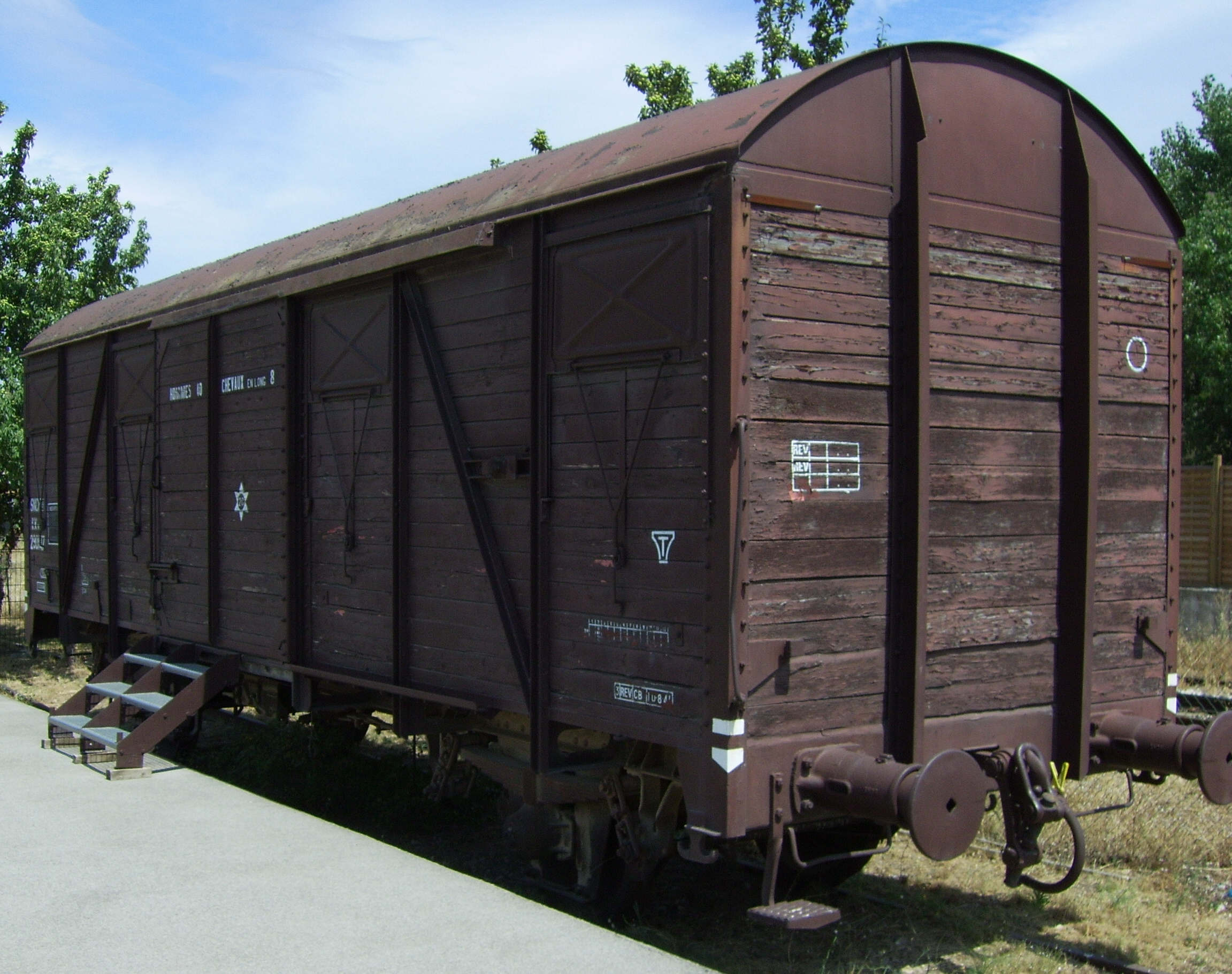
The Holocaust "Güterwagen" boxcars used by Milles and Drancy internment camps in France

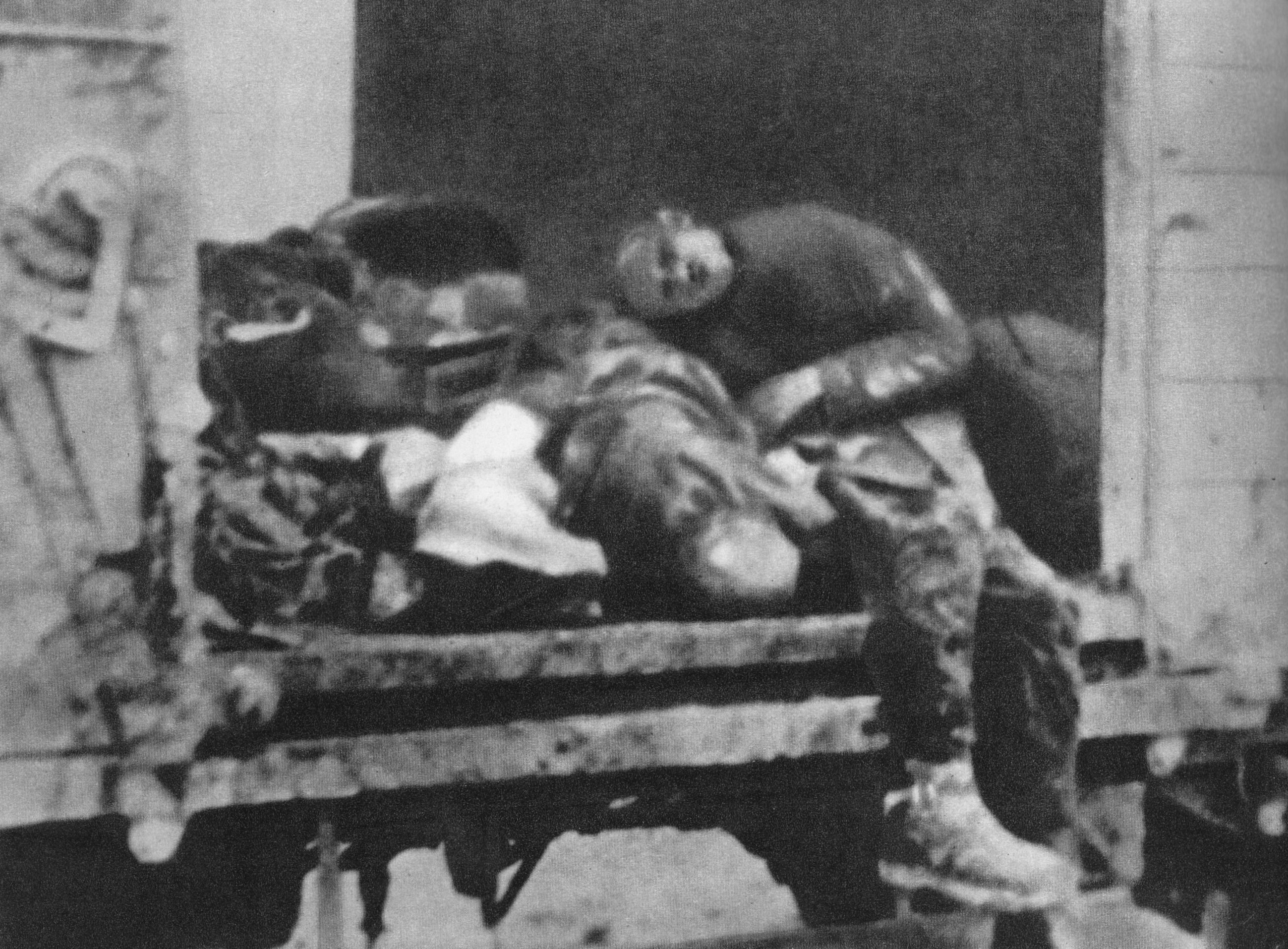
Corpses of Jews from the Warsaw Ghetto who died inside sealed boxcars before reaching Treblinka extermination camp, August 1942

The exhibition was preceded by a public argument between Beate and Serge Klarsfeld and the Deutsche Bahn after the company had refused to show the French exhibition at German railway stations. In an interview in November 2006, Hartmut Mehdorn, the chairman of the Deutsche Bahn, justified the refusal of the exhibition: "At railway stations, there is haste and hurry. They are not locations for a topic as serious as the Holocaust. There can't be any serious and deep study of such a topic at railway stations. We know our stations and the people who pass through them. I even tend towards saying that it would be counterproductive to realize it. "Shock and go" doesn't work any more."

Furthermore, he stated that the Deutsche Bahn "has portrayed its history in an exemplary manner compared with other big companies." He referred to a permanent exhibition in the DB-museum Nuremberg which has 200,000 visitors per year, the participation at the "Entschädigungsfonds für ehemalige Zwangsarbeiter" (a fund which compensates former forced laborers), the education of the company's apprentices and its support of the movie "Der letzte Zug" (The last train). He claimed that Beate and Serge Klarsfeld had tried to "force the exhibition on the company". After the company had refused to let this happen, it claimed to have read in the press that it had tried to block the examination of the Nazi era. Mehdorn announced the establishment of a touring exhibition which should be located close to railway stations. On 1 December 2006, the German federal minister of transport, Wolfgang Tiefensee, and Mehdorn agreed upon the establishment of a touring exhibition about the deportations to be located at railway stations.

== See also ==
- Holocaust trains

== Literature ==
- DB Museum Nürnberg (Hrsg.): Im Dienst von Demokratie und Diktatur. Die Reichsbahn 1920–1945. Katalog zur Dauerausstellung im DB Museum, Nürnberg 2002. 3-9807652-2-9
- Raul Hilberg: Sonderzüge nach Auschwitz. Mainz 1981. ISBN 3-921426-18-9
- Serge Klarsfeld: Le Mémorial des enfants juifs déportés de France. La Shoah en France. Bd 4. Gedenkband an die aus Frankreich deportierten Kinder. Édition Fayard, Paris 2001. ISBN 2-213-61052-5
- Heiner Lichtenstein: Mit der Reichsbahn in den Tod. Massentransporte in den Holocaust 1941 bis 1945. Köln 1985. ISBN 3-7663-0809-2
- Janusz Piekalkiewicz: Die Deutsche Reichsbahn im Zweiten Weltkrieg. Transpress, Stuttgart 1998. ISBN 3-344-70812-0
- Alfred Gottwaldt, Diana Schulle (Hrsg.): Die »Judendeportationen« aus dem Deutschen Reich 1941-1945. Wiesbaden 2007. ISBN 3-86539-059-5
