= Olaf Rose =

German historian and politician

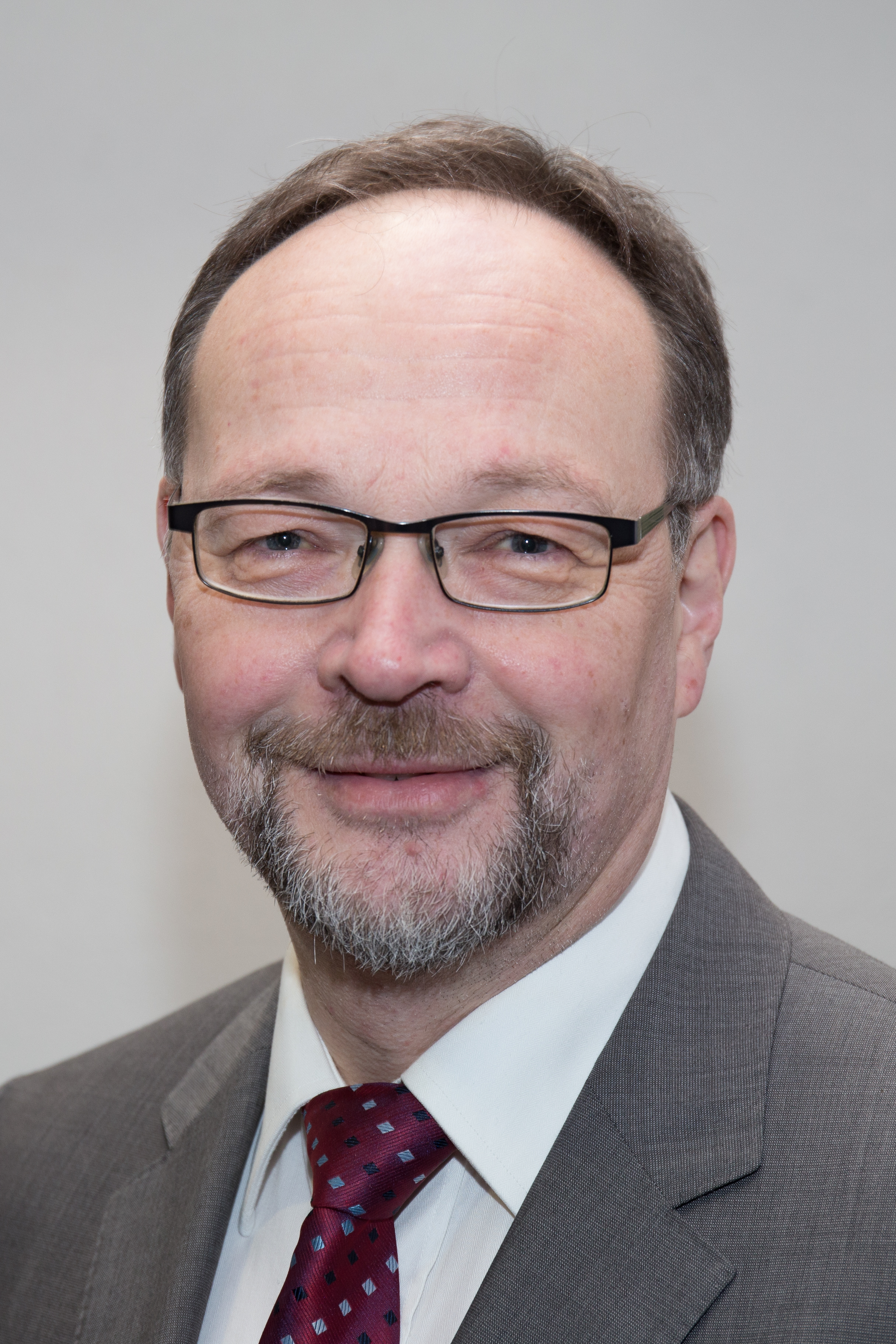
Olaf Rose in 2017

Olaf Rose (born 1958) is a German historian and politician. He represents the far right National Democratic Party of Germany. Since 2006, Rose has worked as a parliamentary adviser to the group of the NPD in the Landtag of Saxony. He is a co-founder of the Gesellschaft für Freie Publizistik and a city councilor in Pirna. From 2008 to 2009, he was a member of the federal board of the NPD.

He was born in Arnsberg in North Rhine-Westphalia. A conscientious objector, he opted for the Zivildienst instead of military service. He studied German and history at the Ruhr University Bochum, and in 1992, he received a doctorate in military history from the Helmut Schmidt University of the Bundeswehr. His dissertation, which was financially supported by the Clausewitz Society, explored the influence of Carl von Clausewitz as a military theorist in Russia and the Soviet Union. As a student and young academic, he held left wing views and contributed to left wing publications. From 1987 to 1996, he worked as an archivist for the Herdecke local government, and has published works on local history.

He unsuccessfully contested the Sächsische Schweiz-Osterzgebirge constituency at the 2009 general election. On 3 March 2012, he was nominated for President of Germany in the 2012 election by the National Democratic Party of Germany, winning only three out of 1,228 votes (= 0.24%).

== Publications ==
- Olaf Rose and Gerhard Duda, "Wacht auf, Verdammte dieser Erde…". Die Sowjetunion 1917 bis 1930. In: Irene Lusk (ed.): Die wilden Zwanziger. Weimar und die Welt 1919–33. West Berlin, Elefanten Press, 1986, pp. 92–99
- Gerhard Duda and Olaf Rose (eds.), Sie waren nicht nur Gegner. Deutsche und Russen in zwei Jahrhunderten. Ein Gedenkbuch. With a preface by Hans-Dietrich Genscher. Straube Verlag, Erlangen, 1990, ISBN 3-927491-31-4.
- Olaf Rose, Carl von Clausewitz: Wirkungsgeschichte seines Werkes in Russland und der Sowjetunion 1836–1991, doctoral dissertation, Schriftenreihe des Militärgeschichtlichen Forschungsamtes/R. Oldenbourg Verlag, 1995, ISBN 348656062X, ISBN 9783486560626
- Olaf Rose: 20 Jahre IG für Umwelt-, Landschafts- und Heimatschutz Herdecke (Ruhr) e.V. – Eine Chronik 1972–1992. 1992.
- Olaf Rose, Tanja Schmidt: Zeitfunken. Historische Miniaturen aus dem Ennepe-Ruhr-Kreis. With a preface by Wolfgang Clement. Edition Märkische Raute, Gevelsberg 1998.
- Alexander Swetschin: Clausewitz. Eine klassische Biographie aus Rußland (= Dümmlerbuch 8215). Translated by and with an introduction by Olaf Rose and Hans-Ulrich Seidt. With a preface by Vice Admiral Ulrich Weisser. Ferd. Dümmlers Verlag, Bonn 1997, ISBN 3-427-82151-X (Bildungsverlag Eins, 1999).
- Else Thiele, Fritz Thiele: Ortschronik Herdecke. 1938–1940. Edition Märkische Raute, Bochum, 2000.
- John David Bee, Olaf Rose: Im Schatten des Kilimandjaro. Eine Geschichte aus dem alten Ostafrika. Druffel & Vowinckel-Verlag, Inning am Ammersee 2001, ISBN 3-86118-101-0.
- Olaf Rose: U 751. Triumph und Tragödie eines deutschen U-Bootes. Ein Gedenkbuch. Kurt Vowinckel Verlag, Inning am Ammersee 2002, ISBN 3-934531-14-8
- Rolf Kosiek, Olaf Rose, Heinrich Wendig: Der Große Wendig – Richtigstellungen zur Zeitgeschichte (= Veröffentlichungen des Institutes für Deutsche Nachkriegsgeschichte 36, 37, 41, 49, 52). 5 Bde., Grabert-Verlag, Tübingen 2006–2010
