= 2012 German presidential election =

- 18 March 2012
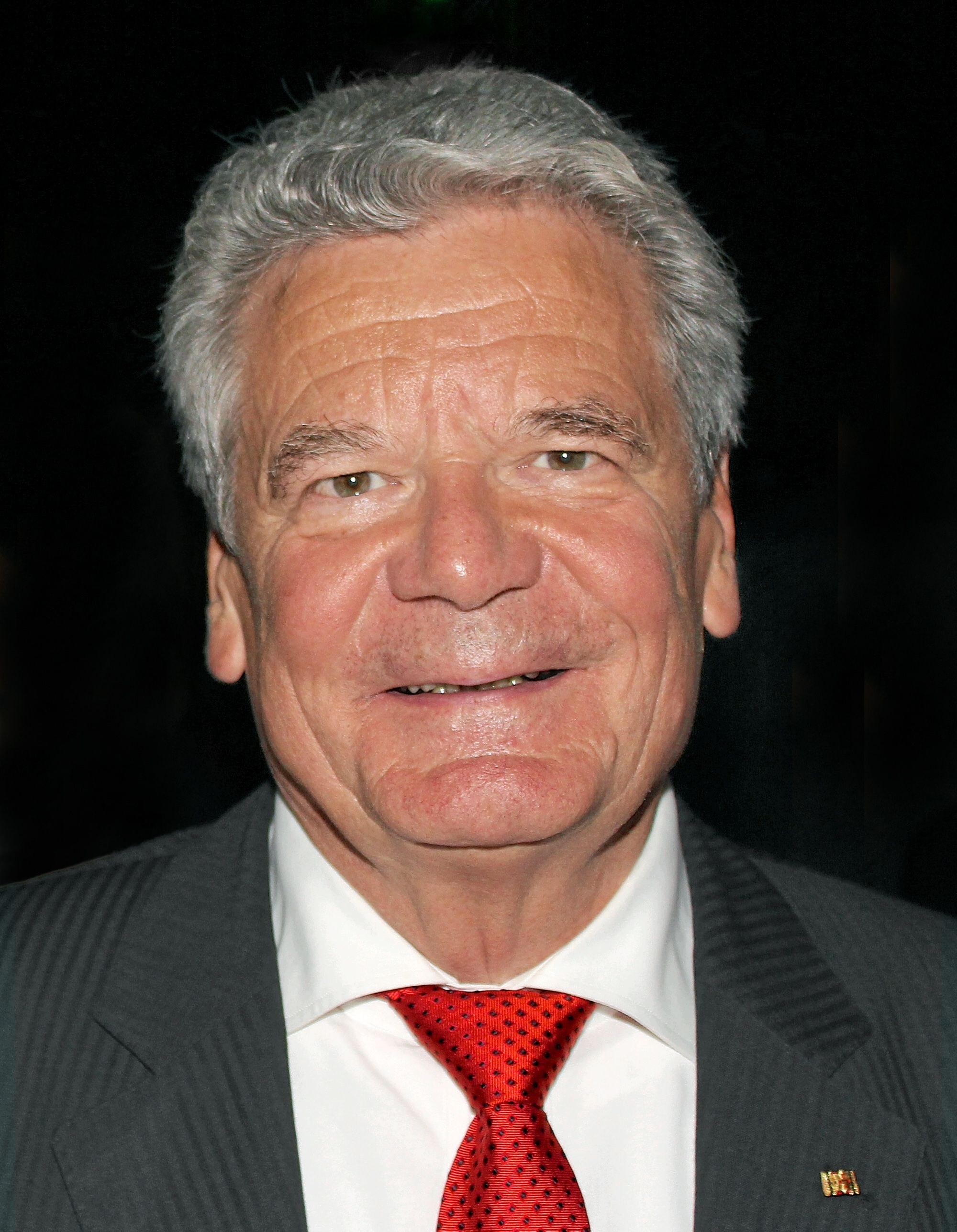

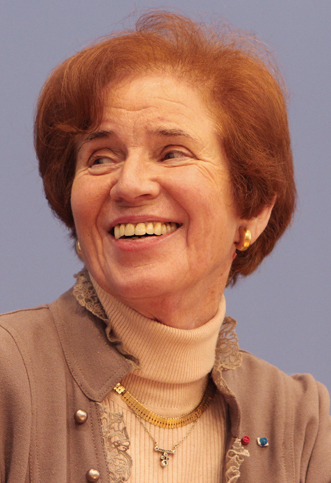
Nominee	Joachim Gauck	Beate Klarsfeld
Party	Independent	Independent
Electoral vote	991	126
Percentage	79.92%	10.16%
Nominators	CDU/CSU, SPD, Grüne, FDP, SSW	Die Linke
President before election
Horst Seehofer (acting)
CSU
Elected President
Joachim Gauck
Independent

An early indirect presidential election (officially the 15th Federal Convention) was held in Germany on 18 March 2012, the last possible day following the resignation of Christian Wulff as President of Germany on 17 February 2012. Joachim Gauck was elected on the first ballot by a Federal Convention, consisting of the 620 members of the Bundestag and an equal number of members selected by the states of Germany based on proportional representation.

On 19 February 2012, Joachim Gauck was nominated as the joint presidential candidate of the governing coalition (CDU, CSU, and FDP) and the opposition (SPD and Greens). He also had the support of the Free Voters and the South Schleswig Voter Federation.

Gauck became the first independent candidate to win a presidential election since the end of the Second World War, and the second overall since Paul von Hindenburg, who was elected in 1925 and re-elected in 1932.

== Background ==
In December 2011, allegations emerged concerning Christian Wulff's former ties with affluent businessmen. While he was still Prime Minister of Lower Saxony, Wulff denied having had any business ties with Egon Geerkens, despite having received a private home loan of about €500,000 from Egon's wife Edith in 2008 and which Geerkens had admitted arranging. On 22 December 2011, Wulff made a public statement apologizing for his handling of the loan affair and conceded that he should have made his personal records available more quickly.

Later, it was alleged that President Wulff had applied undue pressure to Springer Press to delay or even prevent initial revelations of the loan scandal. By the beginning of January 2012, President Wulff had already lost public support, commentators were calling for him to resign, the opposition was again increasing pressure, and his own party was distancing itself from him over the allegations.

On 4 January 2012, Wulff said in an interview that he wanted to stay in office and that the call to Bild editor Kai Diekmann had been a "serious mistake" that was "unworthy" of a president and for which he had already apologized.

As more allegations of possible corruption emerged, the prosecutors in Hanover asked the Bundestag to lift Wulff's presidential immunity in order to investigate the possible granting or accepting of undue favors. Pre-empting this, Wulff resigned on 17 February 2012, explaining that the loss of the people's trust had damaged his effectiveness.

== Procedure ==
To win, a candidate must win an absolute majority on one of the first two ballots or a plurality on the third. Until the new president was elected, Horst Seehofer of the Christian Social Union (CSU), President of the Bundesrat, served as acting head of state.

== Candidates ==
=== CDU, CSU, FDP, SPD, Greens, Free Voters and SSW ===
In the days following Wulff's resignation, the media speculated about several candidates, among them Joachim Gauck, Thomas de Maizière and Klaus Töpfer. Chancellor Angela Merkel said she would consult with the Social Democrats and The Greens to find a consensus candidate to replace Wulff.

On 19 February 2012, the governing coalition's CDU, CSU, and FDP and the opposition SPD and Greens agreed on independent Joachim Gauck, the 2010 presidential candidate of the SPD and Greens, as their joint candidate. This happened after the FDP, the SPD, and the Greens had strongly supported Gauck and urged CDU to support him as well. The SPD chairman, Sigmar Gabriel, had already stated on 17 February 2012 that Gauck was his party's preferred candidate, alleging that Gauck enjoys "great trust from the citizenry". Reportedly, Merkel conceded to FDP chairman (and Vice-Chancellor) Philipp Rösler's staunch support for Gauck; the agreement was announced after the FDP presidium had unanimously voted for Gauck earlier on 19 February. The Free Voters in Bavaria and the Danish minority party, the South Schleswig Voter Federation, also supported Gauck.

On the night of being nominated, Gauck warned Germans that he should not be seen as "Superman" following two successive short-lived presidencies. In the week prior to the election, Die Zeit also said that Gauck could teach Germans that "we can learn that democracy means thinking and acting for one's self rather than waiting for political redeemers."

=== Minor parties ===
Die Linke nominated Beate Klarsfeld, an activist who is not a member of any party, as a candidate. The National Democratic Party of Germany nominated Olaf Rose, a historian who works as an adviser to the group of the NPD in the Landtag of Saxony. The German Pirate Party considered naming a separate candidate but failed to do so before the election.

== Federal Convention ==
The number of seats per party is as follows:

Party	Members (total)	Members		Share
Party	Members (total)	Bundestag MPs	Länder delegates	Share
CDU/CSU	486	237	249	39.2%
SPD	331	146	185	26.7%
Alliance '90/The Greens	147	68	79	11.9%
FDP	136	93	43	11.0%
The Left	124	76	48	10.0%
Free Voters (Bavaria)	10	0	10	0.8%
NPD	3	0	3	0.2%
Pirate Party (Berlin)	2	0	2	0.2%
SSW (Schleswig-Holstein)	1	0	1	0.1%
Total	1240	620	620	100%

== Results ==
Voting started at noon. At 14:24 on 18 March 2012, Gauck accepted his election. He was elected in the first ballot with 991 votes in the Federal Convention. Bundestag president Norbert Lammert announced the result. In reaction, Gauck exclaimed: "What a beautiful Sunday", also referring to the anniversary of 18 March 1990 when East Germans had been able to vote freely for the first time.

Candidate	Party	Supporting party	First	
Candidate	Party	Supporting party	Votes	%
Joachim Gauck	Independent	CDU/CSU, SPD, Alliance '90/The Greens, FDP and SSW	991	79.92
Beate Klarsfeld	Independent	The Left	126	10.16
Olaf Rose	Independent	NPD	3	0.24
Abstentions			108	8.76
Invalid votes			4	0.32
Total			1,232	99.35
Eligible voters			1,240	100

== Reactions ==
European Commission President José Manuel Barroso congratulated Gauck. Quoting Goethe, he said: "Freedom and life are earned by those alone who conquer them each day anew."
