= Kurt Asche =

German SS-Obersturmführer

Kurt Asche (11 October 1909 in Hamburg – 16 April 1997 in Hamburg) was SS-Obersturmführer and an officer in German-occupied Belgium.

Asche was appointed head of the Office of Jewish Affairs in occupied Belgium. He was one of a number of these so-called "Jewish experts" sent by Adolf Eichmann to occupied countries and client states to take charge of deportation of the local Jewish populations. He was involved in the Holocaust and, from 1942 to 1944, was responsible for the deportation of 26,000 Jews and Gypsies to Auschwitz. In May 1944, an SS police court sentenced him one year and four months in prison for enriching himself from the assets of Belgian Jews. In January 1945, he was released from prison and transferred to an SS combat unit.

Asche was eventually brought to trial in Kiel for his part in the 26,000 deaths. After a mammoth trial that lasted eighteen years Asche was eventually sentenced to seven years imprisonment in 1981. The perceived leniency of the sentence, as well as Asche being allowed to leave the court free following sentencing as the sentence had to be ratified, led to widespread condemnation. Asche began serving his sentence in 1983. He was released from prison in 1987.
