= Confederation of European Journeymen Associations =

The Confederation of European Journeymen Associations is the umbrella organisation of journeymen unions and brotherhoods in Europe. Its official title is a Franco-German compound Confédération Compagnonnages Européens/Europäische Gesellenzünfte, abbreviated as CCEG.

== Description ==
The organisation was founded in 1968 in Paris. Its statute has been registered at court of Strasbourg (Tribunal d'instance de Strasbourg) and the organisation has been accredited at the Council of Europe in Strasbourg since 1978.

International meetings are held every five years to elect a new president. In general the presidency rotates amongst the associations. The meeting language is French and German. The few information on their website has automated translations to English and Danish.

The journeyman associations support wandering journeymen. In general the membership in an association is not limited to nationality but a working knowledge of the language is required along with a completed apprenticeship in a profession. Only those associations have survived from the middle ages that support professions required on construction sites. For example the Rolandsschacht union requires an aspirant to be male, below the age of 27, and with a profession as carpenter, bricklayer, stonemason, joiner, roofer, slater, paver, carver or concrete worker. Additionally a membership in a trade union is required.

== Members ==
German-speaking

- Rechtschaffene Fremde Zimmerer und Schieferdeckergesellen (black tie, only wood workers)
- Rechtschaffene Fremde Maurer und Steinhauergesellen (black tie, only mason workers)
- Rolandschacht (blue tie with a golden needle)
- Fremder Freiheitsschacht (red tie with a needle)
- Freie Vogtländer Deutschlands (golden needle and buttons)

French-speaking

- Union Compagnonnique Des Devoirs Unis
- Fédération Nationale Compagnonnique des Métiers du Bâtiment (France)
- Fédération Compagnonnique des Métiers du Bâtiment de Belgique (Belgium)

Scandinavian

- Forenede berejste Skandinaviske Handwaerkere FBSH (Denmark)

== See also ==
- Operative Plasterers' and Cement Masons' International Association in north america
