= Goodwill ambassador (disambiguation) =

A goodwill ambassador is a professional occupation and/or authoritative designation assigned to a person who advocates for a specific cause or global issue on the basis of their notability such as a public figure, advocate or an authoritative expert.

Goodwill Ambassador, Goodwill Ambassadors, or Goodwill ambassadorship may also refer to:

- FAO Goodwill Ambassador, official title of a goodwill ambassador advocating for the Food and Agricultural Organization
- Goodwill ® Ambassadors, may refer to employees of any one of 10 or more used merchandise stores owned by Goodwill Industries
- UN Goodwill Ambassador, an official designation for celebrities named as United Nations Messengers of Peace
- UN Women Goodwill Ambassador, celebrity advocate for UN Women (UN Entity for Gender Equality and the Empowerment of Women)
- UNAIDS Goodwill Ambassador, political figures, celebrities, and subject matter experts from the Joint United Nations Programme on HIV/AIDS
- UNDP Goodwill Ambassador, prominent individual that serves as a goodwill ambassador to advocate the mission of the UNDP
- UNESCO Goodwill Ambassador, public figure that advocates for UNESCO
- UNFPA Goodwill Ambassador, celebrity advocate of the United Nations Population Fund mission
- UNHCR Goodwill Ambassador, celebrity advocate of the United Nations High Commissioner for Refugees'
- UNICEF Goodwill Ambassador, local, regional and internationally known public figure that is selected to promote the mission of UNICEF
- UNIDO Goodwill Ambassador, public figure or expert that advocates for the United Nations Industrial Development Organization mission
- UNODC Goodwill Ambassador, celebrity advocate of the United Nations Office on Drugs and Crime
- WFP Goodwill Ambassador, expert or high-profile personality advocating for the World Food Programme
- WHO Goodwill Ambassador, a celebrity advocate of the World Health Organization
