= List of UNICEF Goodwill Ambassadors =

This is a list of UNICEF Goodwill Ambassadors and advocates, who work on behalf of the United Nations International Children's Emergency Fund (UNICEF) for children's rights. UNICEF goodwill ambassadors are usually selected by regional and national UNICEF offices, the primary office at the United Nations building in New York is responsible for international appointments. UNICEF has the largest and most extensive goodwill ambassador and human rights advocacy program in the world for children.

== International ambassadors and advocates from inception ==
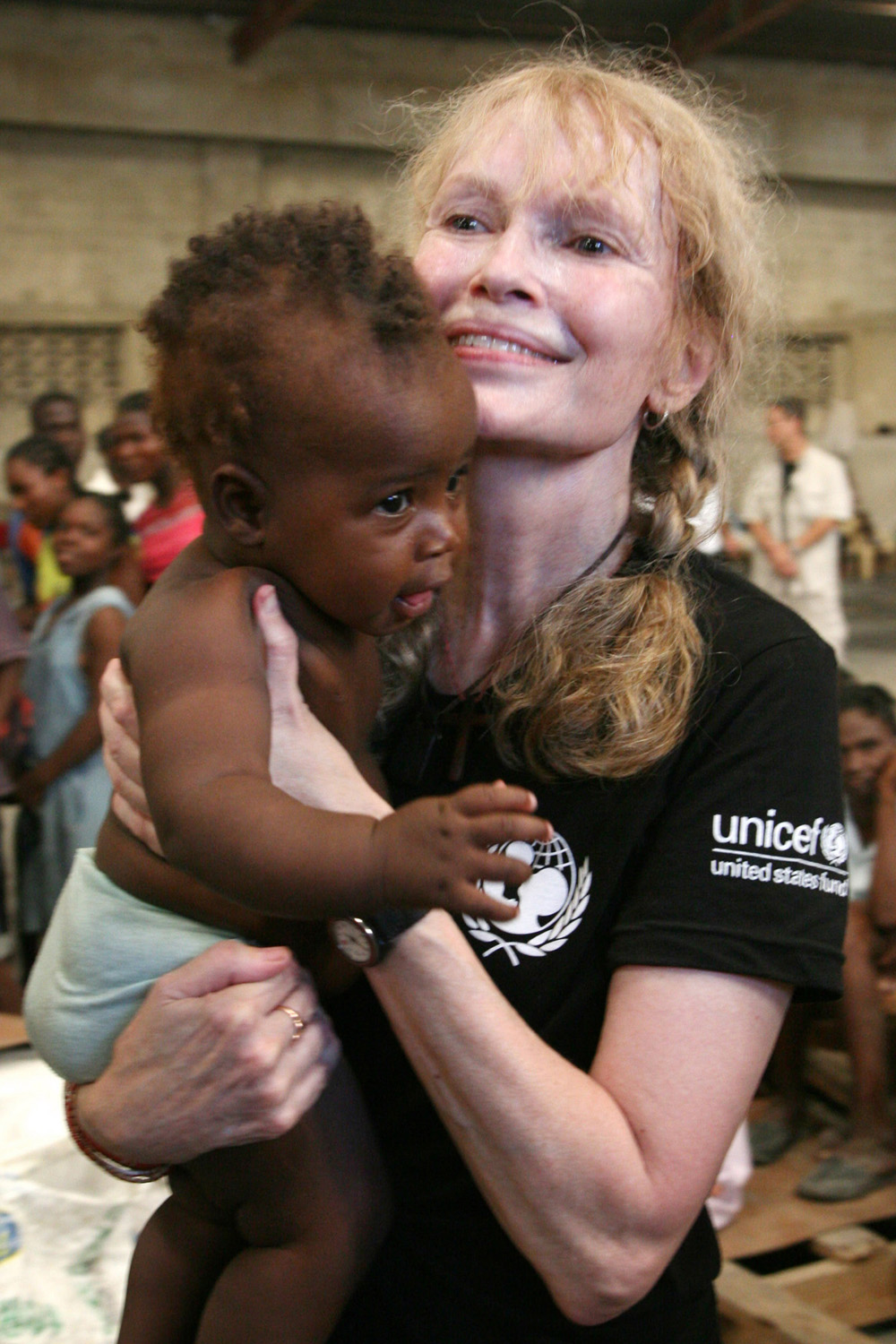
Mia Farrow, UNICEF Goodwill Ambassador, holding an infant in Gonaïves in the aftermath of Hurricane Hanna

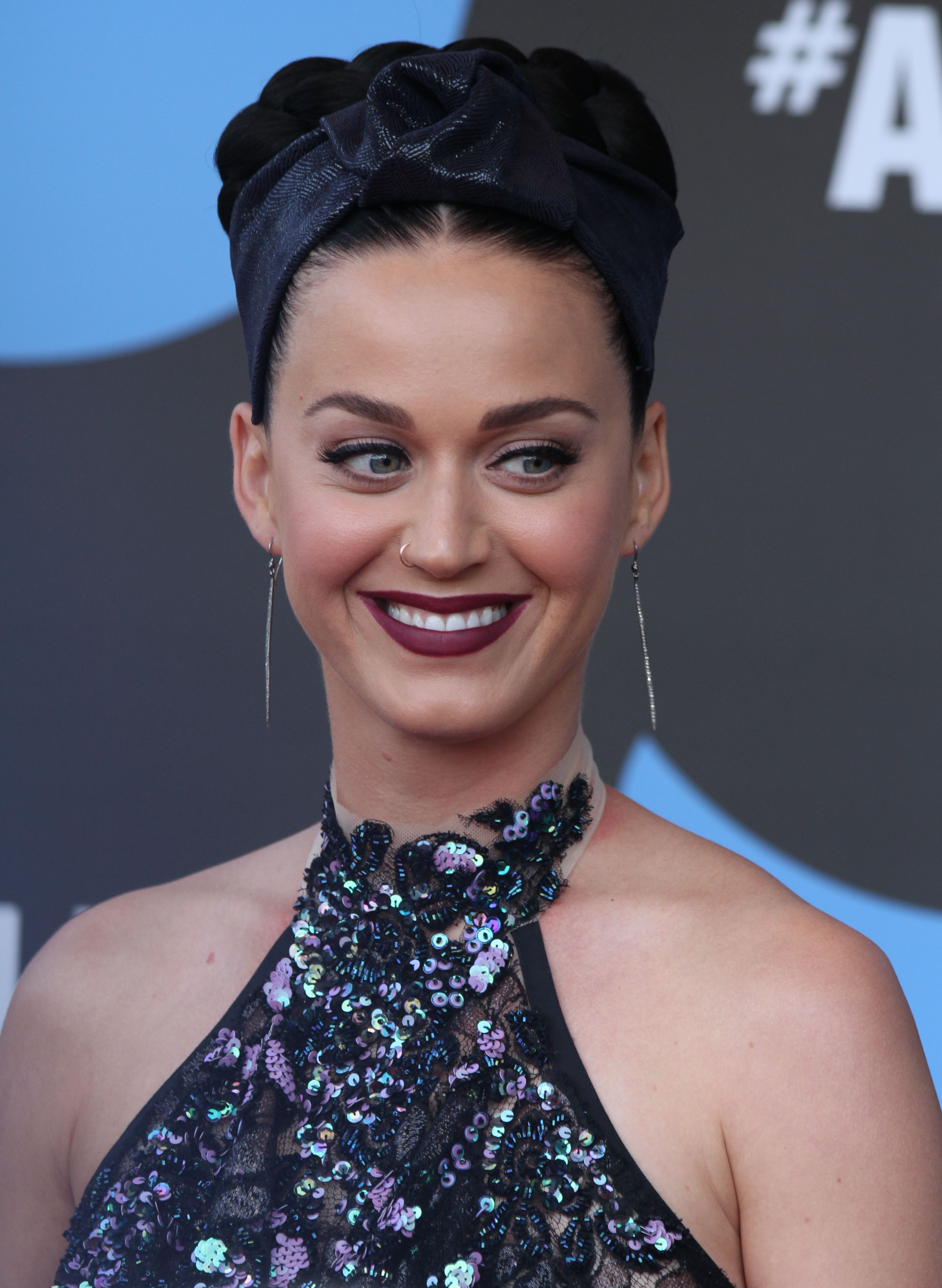
Katy Perry became an UNICEF Goodwill Ambassador on December 2013

In order of appointment:

- (United States) Danny Kaye (1954)
- (United Kingdom) Peter Ustinov (1968)
- (Japan) Tetsuko Kuroyanagi (February 1984)
- (United Kingdom) Richard Attenborough (October 1987)
- (United Kingdom) Audrey Hepburn (1989)
- (Senegal) Youssou N'Dour (April 1991)
- (United Kingdom) Roger Moore (August 1991)
- (Greece) Nana Mouskouri (October 1993)
- (Hong Kong) Leon Lai (July 1994)
- (Norway) Johann Olav Koss (December 1994)
- (United Kingdom) Vanessa Redgrave (June 1995)
- (United States) Judy Collins (September 1995)
- (Sweden) Vendela Kirsebom (May 1996)
- (Liberia) George Weah (April 1997)
- (Russia) Maxim Vengerov (July 1997)
- (United States) Susan Sarandon (December 1999)
- (United States) Mia Farrow (September 2000)
- (Brazil) Sebastião Salgado (April 2001)
- (Nigeria) Femi Kuti (June 2002)
- (Benin) Angélique Kidjo (July 2002)
- (United States) Jessica Lange (June 2003)
- (United States) Whoopi Goldberg (September 2003)
- (Colombia) Shakira (October 2003)
- (Puerto Rico) Ricky Martin (December 2003)
- (Hong Kong) Jackie Chan (April 2004)
- (China) Lang Lang (May 2004)
- (United States) Danny Glover (September 2004)
- (United Kingdom) David Beckham (January 2005)
- (India) Amitabh Bachchan (April 2005)
- (Switzerland) Roger Federer (April 2006)
- Queen Rania of Jordan (January 2007)
- Maria Teresa, Grand Duchess of Luxembourg (April 2007)
- (South Africa) Gavin Rajah (August 2007)
- (Germany) Berliner Philharmoniker (November 2007)
- (United Kingdom) Simon Rattle (November 2007)
- (Algeria) Biyouna (November 2012)
- (Sierra Leone) Ishmael Beah (November 2007)
- (South Korea) Myung-whun Chung (April 2008)
- (Ukraine) Maria Guleghina (February 2009)
- (United States) Selena Gomez (September 2009)
- (United Kingdom) Orlando Bloom (October 2009)
- (Argentina) Lionel Messi (March 2010)
- (South Korea) Yuna Kim (July 2010)
- (Republic of Ireland) Liam Neeson (March 2011)
- (United States) Serena Williams (September 2011)
- (Sweden) Mikael Persbrandt (2011)
- (United States) Katy Perry (December 2013)
- (Serbia) Novak Djokovic (August 2015)
- (India) Priyanka Chopra (December 2016)
- (Canada) Lilly Singh (July 2017)
- (United Kingdom) Millie Bobby Brown (November 2018)
- (Uganda) Vanessa Nakate (September 2022)
- (Senegal) Khaby Lame (February 2025)
- (Spain) Lamine Yamal (June 2026)

== Regional ambassadors ==
In order of appointment:

=== South Asia ===
- (India) Sachin Tendulkar (November 2013)
- (India) Aamir Khan (October 2014)

=== Central and Eastern Europe ===
- (Russia) Anatoly Karpov (June 1988)
- (Slovenia) Milena Zupančič (1998)

=== Latin America ===
- (Argentina) Diego Torres (November 2006)
- (Venezuela) Ricardo Montaner (November 2007)

=== Middle East and North Africa ===
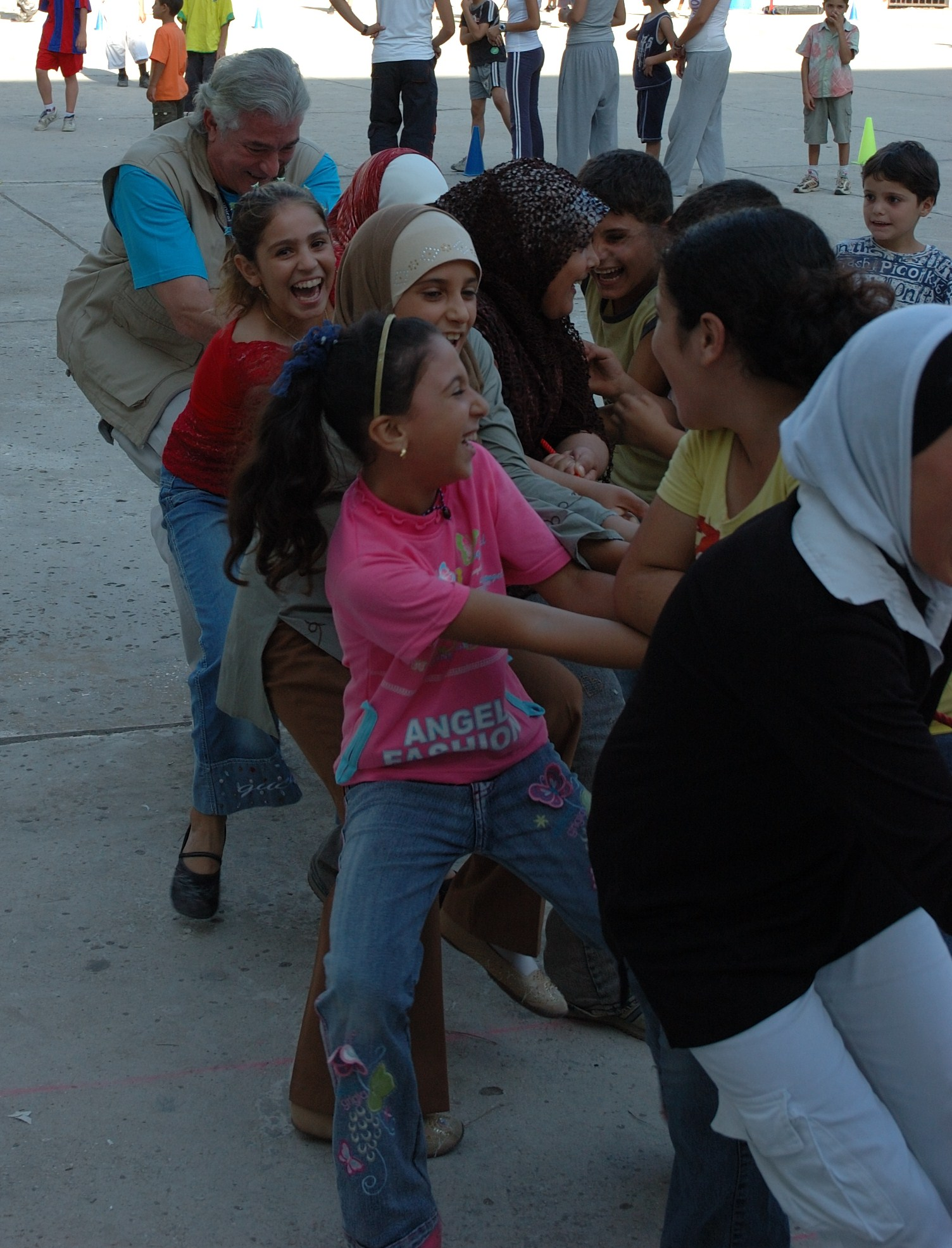
Regional ambassador Mahmoud Kabil joins a game of tug-of-war at a UNICEF/Intersos outreach centre.

- (Egypt) Mahmoud Kabil (January 2004)
- (Lebanon) Nancy Ajram (October 2009)

=== Eastern and Southern Africa ===
- (South Africa) Yvonne Chaka Chaka (April 2005)
- (South Africa) Zola (November 2006)
- (Madagascar) Name Six (May 2007)
- (Zimbabwe) Oliver Mtukudzi (June 2011)
- (Zimbabwe) Tendai Mtawarira (2022)

=== Francophone countries ===
- (France) Patrick Poivre d'Arvor (January 2007)

=== East Asia and Pacific ===
- (Hong Kong) Miriam Yeung (October 2009)
- (Fiji) Merewalesi Nailatikau (February 2011)
- (Hong Kong) Aaron Kwok (October 2011)
- (Japan) Agnes Chan (2016)
- (South Korea) Choi Siwon (October 2019)
- (Solomon Islands) Gladys Habu (2021)

== National ambassadors ==
In order of appointment:

=== Afghanistan ===
- Rais Ahmadzai (September 2011)
- Rashid Khan (March 2019)

=== Algeria ===
- Madjid Bougherra (January 2011)
- Salima Souakri (October 2011)

=== Andorra ===
- Gerard Claret (November 2010)
- Albert Llovera (November 2010)

=== Argentina ===
- Julián Weich (2000)
- Manu Ginóbili (August 2007)
- Natalia Oreiro (September 2011)

=== Armenia ===
- Alla Levonyan (April 2007)
- Henrikh Mkhitaryan (9 November 2016)
- Artur Aleksanyan (2019)
- Maléna (2022)

=== Australia ===
- John Doyle (1993)
- Greig Pickhaver (1993)
- Ken Done (1988)
- Jimmy Barnes (2004)
- Geoffrey Rush (2006)
- The Wiggles (2008)
- Tara Moss (2008)
- Morris Gleitzman (2011)
- Carrie Bickmore (2012)
- Brett Emerton (2012)
- Callan McAuliffe (2013)
- Steven Solomon (2013)
- Adam Liaw (August 2013)

=== Austria ===
- Thomas Brezina (1996)
- Christiane Hörbiger (2003)

=== Azerbaijan ===
- Teimour Radjabov (May 2006)

=== Bangladesh ===
- Arifa Zaman Moushumi (September 2013)
- Jewel Aich (September 2013)
- Shakib Al Hasan (September 2013)

=== Belarus ===
- Max Mirnyi (November 2011)
- Vladimir Pougatch (November 2014)

=== Belgium ===
- Helmut Lotti (1997)
- Tom Waes (2014)
- Nafissatou Thiam (2017)
- Henri PFR (2019)

=== Benin ===
- Zeynab (September 2007)

=== Bolivia ===
- Juan Carlos 'Chavo' Salvatierra (May 2014)

=== Bosnia and Herzegovina ===
- Edin Džeko (November 2009)

=== Brazil ===
- Renato Aragão (September 1991)
- Daniela Mercury (October 1995)
- Felipe Massa (October 2007)
- Mauricio de Sousa (November 2007)
- Mônica (November 2007)
- Lázaro Ramos (July 2009)

=== Bulgaria ===
- Ani Salich (November 2006)
- Vladimir Ampov (Grafa) (September 2014)

=== Canada ===
- Veronica Tennant (1992)
- Elizabeth Dallaire (2007)
- Jan Lisiecki (2008)
- John Nsabimana (2008)
- Bayan Yammout (2011)
- Solange Tuyishime (2010)
- Karina LeBlanc (2013)
- GFORCE (2019)
- Simu Liu (2020)

=== Chile ===
- Iván Zamorano (1998)
- Benjamín Vicuña (January 2008)

=== China ===
- Maggie Cheung (April 2010)
- Yang Lan (April 2010)
- Chen Kun (April 2012)
- Roy Wang (November 2018)

=== Colombia ===
- Carlos Vives, Claudia Elena Vasquez, Elena Vives Vasquez, The Family, August 2009
- Nicole Regnier (March 2014)
- Aida Morales (5 December 2016)
- Belky Arizala (5 December 2016)
- Carolina Cruz (5 December 2016)
- Daniella Álvarez (5 December 2016)
- Johanna Morales (5 December 2016)
- Iván Lalinde (5 December 2016)
- Karin Jiménez (5 December 2016)
- Marcela Carvajal (5 December 2016)
- Mónica Rodriguez (5 December 2016)
- Nairo Quintana (5 December 2016)
- Natalia Jerez (5 December 2016)
- Pedro Ruiz (5 December 2016)
- Santiago Arias (5 December 2016)
- Andrés Cepeda (10 November 2017)

=== Croatia ===
- Zlatan Stipišić Gibonni (July 2003)
- Bojana Gregorić (August 2004)
- Maja Vučić (November 2006)
- Slaven Bilić (February 2009)
- Mirna Medakovic Stepinac (1 December 2018)

=== Cuba ===
- Ernán López-Nussa (1995)
- La Colmenita (2007)
- Raúl Paz (2009)
- X-Alfonso (2010)
- Litz Alfonso (December 2011)

=== Cyprus ===
- Nasos Ktorides (February 2012)

=== Czech Republic ===
- Patrik Eliáš (August 2006)
- Michal Viewegh (February 2011)
- Jitka Čvančarová (February 2015)

=== Democratic Republic of Congo (Democratic Republic of the Congo) ===
- Lomana Trésor LuaLua (June 2009)

=== Denmark ===
- Skæg (August 2016)
- Sofie Østergaard (August 2017)
- Kurt Flemming
- Bubber
- Peter Frödin
- Trine Dyrholm
- Caroline Henderson
- Anders W. Berthelsen
- Sebastian Dorset
- Mek Pek
- Rune Klan
- Birthe Kjær

=== Dominican Republic ===
- Jatnna Tavarez (October 2010)

=== Ecuador ===
- Antonio Valencia (May 2012)
- Karla Kanora (November 2012)

=== Egypt ===
- Khaled Abol Naga (April 2007)

=== Estonia ===
- Maarja-Liis Ilus (1999)
- Eri Klas (1999)
- Erki Nool (1999)
- Children's Music Studio of Estonian Television (November 2009)

=== Ethiopia ===
- Aster Aweke (October 2010)
- Abelone Melese (November 2014)

=== Finland ===
- Eija Ahvo, actress/singer (1986)
- Susanna Haavisto, actress/singer (1986)
- Katri Helena, singer (1990)
- Anna Hanski, singer (1993)
- Iiro Rantala, musician (1993)
- Jorma Uotinen, dancer (1993)
- Eija Vilpas, actress (1993)
- Micke Rejström, actor/juggler (1996)
- Eppu Nuotio, actress/writer (2002)
- Jyrki Linnankivi (Jyrki69), musician (2005)
- Iina Kuustonen, actress (2012)

=== France ===
- Bernard Lama (2004)
- Orchestre Philharmonique de Radio France (2007)
- Oxmo Puccino (October 2012)
- Laëtitia Casta (November 2016)
- Thomas Pesquet

=== Gambia (The Gambia) ===
- Jaliba Kuyateh (December 2006)

=== Georgia (Georgia (country)) ===
- Paata Burchuladze (December 2010)
- Nikoloz Rachveli (June 2018)

=== Germany ===
- Sabine Christiansen (1997)
- Eva Padberg (October 2012)
- Nina Ruge (November 2012)
- Dirk Nowitzki (September 2013)
- Alexander Gerst (2014)
- Mats Hummels (February 2017)

=== Ghana ===
- Marcel Desailly (August 2007)

=== Greece ===
- Helene Glykatzi-Ahrweiler (May 1991)
- Helena Paparizou (2021)
- George Perris (June 2022)

=== Guinea ===
- Sekouba Bambino (May 2018)

=== Guinea Bissau (Guinea-Bissau) ===
- Eneida Marta (December 2013)
- Tchuma Bari (December 2016)

=== Hong Kong ===
- Gigi Leung (2002)
- Charlie Yeung (April 2004)
- Karen Mok (2004)
- Eric Suen (August 2009)
- Wong Kam-po (July 2011)
- Trey Lee Chui-yee (September 2012)
- Sarah Lee Wai-sze (March 2013)
- Guo Jing-jing (January 2014)
- Adam Wong Sau-ping (January 2017)

=== Hungary ===
- Krisztina D.Tóth (2014)

=== India ===
- Sachin Tendulkar (November 2013)
- Ayushman Khurana (February 2023)
- Kareena Kapoor Khan (May 2024)

=== Indonesia ===
- Ferry Salim (2004)
- Nicholas Saputra (2019)

=== Iran ===
- Mahtab Keramati (August 2006)

=== Iraq ===
- Kadhum Al-Sahir (May 2011)

=== Ireland (Republic of Ireland) ===
- Pierce Brosnan (2001)
- Cathy Kelly (2005)
- Stephen Rea (2005)
- Dustin the Turkey (2009)
- Donncha O'Callaghan (2009)
- Joe Canning (September 2010)
- Dermot Earley (September 2010)
- Rory McIlroy (March 2011)

=== Israel ===
- David Broza (June 2012)

=== Italy ===
- Simona Marchini (1987)
- Vigili del Fuoco (1989)
- Roberto Bolle (1999)
- Lino Banfi (2000)
- Francesco Totti (2003)
- Deborah Compagnoni (2003)
- Piccolo Coro dell' Antoniano (2003)
- Mario Porfito (2004)
- Maria Rosaria Omaggio (2005)
- Niky Francisco (2006)
- Paola Saluzzi (2006)
- Alberto Angela (September 2011)
- Angela Finocchiaro (May 2012)

=== Jamaica ===
- Shelly-Ann Fraser-Pryce (February 2010)

=== Japan ===
- Asa Matsuoka (1950–1966)
- Makoto Hasebe (2016)

=== Kenya ===
- Effie Owuor (1997)

=== Kuwait ===
- Suad Abdullah (November 2002)

=== Latvia ===
- Marija Naumova (December 2005)

=== Liechtenstein ===
- Tina Weirather (January 2019)

=== Lithuania ===
- Julian Rachlin (January 2010)

=== Luxembourg ===
- Liz May (April 2010)

=== Malaysia ===
- Upin & Ipin (March 2013)
- Lisa Surihani (February 2017)

=== Mali ===
- Habib Koité (May 2010)

=== Mexico ===
- César Costa (August 2004)
- Julieta Venegas (September 2009)
- Javier Hernández (May 2012)
- Thalía (July 2016)

=== Mongolia ===
- Tumur Ariuna (June 2001)
- Asashōryū Dagvadorj (November 2003)

=== Montenegro ===
- Rambo Amadeus (October 2006)

=== Morocco ===
- Hanane El Fadili (July 2010)

=== Mozambique ===
- Neyma (2014)

=== Namibia ===
- Frank Fredericks (September 2005)
- Agnes Samaria (September 2005)

=== Nepal ===
- Ani Choying Drolma (April 2014)

=== Netherlands ===
- Paul van Vliet (1992)
- Monique van de Ven (1996)
- Sipke Jan Bousema (2002)
- Trijntje Oosterhuis (2004)
- Jörgen Raymann (2005)
- Edwin Evers (2005)
- Renate Verbaan (2010)
- Claudia de Breij (April 2012)
- Ranomi Kromowidjojo (June 2013)
- Klaas van Kruistum (2017)

=== New Zealand ===
- Gareth and Joanne Morgan (2007)
- Mike Roberts
- Roger Hall

=== Nigeria ===
- Nwankwo Kanu (June 2005)

=== Norway ===
- Ole Gunnar Solskjær (2001)
- Sissel Kyrkjebø (November 2005)
- Kjetil André Aamodt (2007)

=== Pakistan ===
- Faisal Kapadia and Bilal Maqsood (Strings) (September 2005)

=== Paraguay ===
- Menchi Barriocanal (July 2005)

=== Peru ===
- Gian Marco Zignago (February 2006)
- Dina Páucar (May 2008)
- Gastón Acurio (August 2009)
- Mónica Sánchez (September 2011)

=== Philippines ===
- Gary Valenciano (1997)
- Anne Curtis (2019)

=== Poland ===
- Majka Jeżowska (2003)
- Małgorzata Foremniak (2006)
- Artur Żmijewski (2007)
- Natalia Kukulska (2007)
- Magdalena Różczka (2010)
- Robert Lewandowski(2014)
- Robert Korzeniowski (2017)
- Łukasz Nowicki (2018)
- Agnieszka Radwańska (2019)

=== Portugal ===
- Pedro Couceiro (April 1995)
- Luís Figo (2003)
- Mariza (October 2005)

=== Romania ===
- Andreea Marin (December 2006)
- Gheorghe Hagi (September 2008)
- Smiley (November 2013)
- Horia Tecău (April 2017)

=== Russia ===
- Oxana Fedorova (2007)
- Dmitry Fedorov (Representative for Work of Goodwill Ambassadors) (June 2019)

=== Serbia ===
- Aleksandar Đorđević (January 2005)
- Ana Ivanovic (September 2007)
- Jelena Janković (December 2007)

=== Slovakia ===
- Kamila Magálová (1995)
- Stanislav Štepka (2001)
- Martin Pyco Rausch (2011)
- Jaro Bekr (October 2015)

=== South Africa ===
- Quinton Fortune (March 2004)
- Gavin Rajah (August 2007)

=== South Korea ===
- Ahn Sung-ki (May 1993)
- Hwang Byung-Ki (December 1996)
- Sohn Pum-Soo (October 1999)
- Mee-Hwa Kim (December 1999)
- Myung-wha Chung (December 1999)
- Lee Byung-hun (2003)
- Kim Rae-won (2007)
- Won Bin (2007)
- Lee Bo-young (2008)
- Richard Yongjae O'Neill (2008)
- Kim Hye-soo (2012)
- Shin Kyung-sook (2012)
- INFINITE/ 인피니트 (2012)
- Gong Yoo (2013)
- Choi Siwon (2015)
- Jang Sa-ik (2015)
- Ji Sung (2017)
- Felix (2024)

=== Spain ===
- Joan Manuel Serrat (March 1998)
- Emilio Aragón (March 2000)
- Imanol Arias (May 2000)
- Pedro Delgado (September 2000)
- Ana Duato (December 2000)
- Teresa Viejo (December 2000)
- Eusebio Sacristán (December 2002)
- Pau Gasol (May 2003)
- Silvia Abascal (September 2003)
- María Bayo (January 2004)
- Fernando Alonso (March 2005)
- Rafael Guijosa (March 2005)
- Los Lunnis (March 2005)
- Sergio Ramos (June 2014)
- José Calderón (August 2014)
- David Bisbal (April 2017)

=== St. Lucia (Saint Lucia) ===
- Taj Weekes (November 2013)

=== Sudan ===
- Nancy Agag (December 2016)

=== Sweden ===
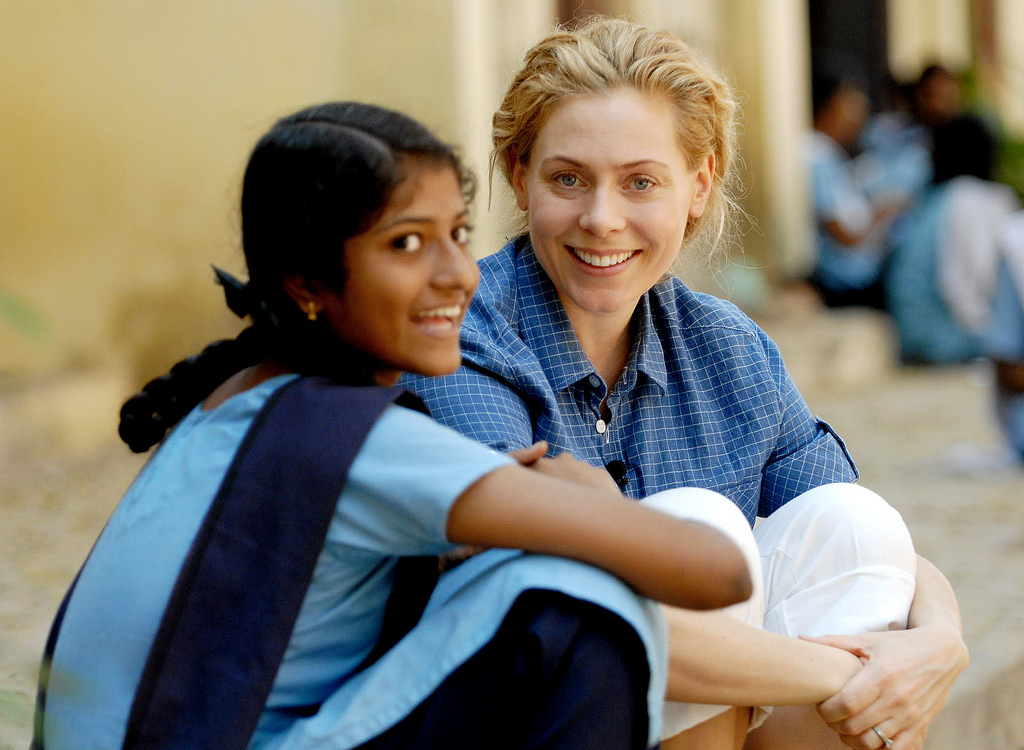
Swedish UNICEF national ambassador Eva Röse (right) during a visit to India

- Lill Lindfors (1998)
- Eva Röse (2007)
- Mark Levengood (2008)
- Jenny Strömstedt (2015)
- Morgan Alling (2019)
- Maja Nilsson Lindelöf (2020)
- Victor Nilsson Lindelöf (2020)
- Asabea Britton (2022)
- Daniel Riley (2022)

=== Switzerland and Liechtenstein ===
- Kurt Aeschbacher (October 2004)
- Anatole Taubman (December 2018)

=== Thailand ===
- Anand Panyarachun (January 1996)

=== Turkey ===
- Önder Sisters (October 2003)
- Gülsin Onay (November 2003)
- Tayfun Talipoğlu (November 2006)
- Müjdat Gezen (November 2007)
- Ayşe Kulin (November 2007)
- İbrahim Kutluay (March 2008)
- Türkan Şoray (March 2010)
- Kıvanç Tatlıtuğ (March 2011)
- Tuba Büyüküstün (May 2014)

=== United Kingdom ===
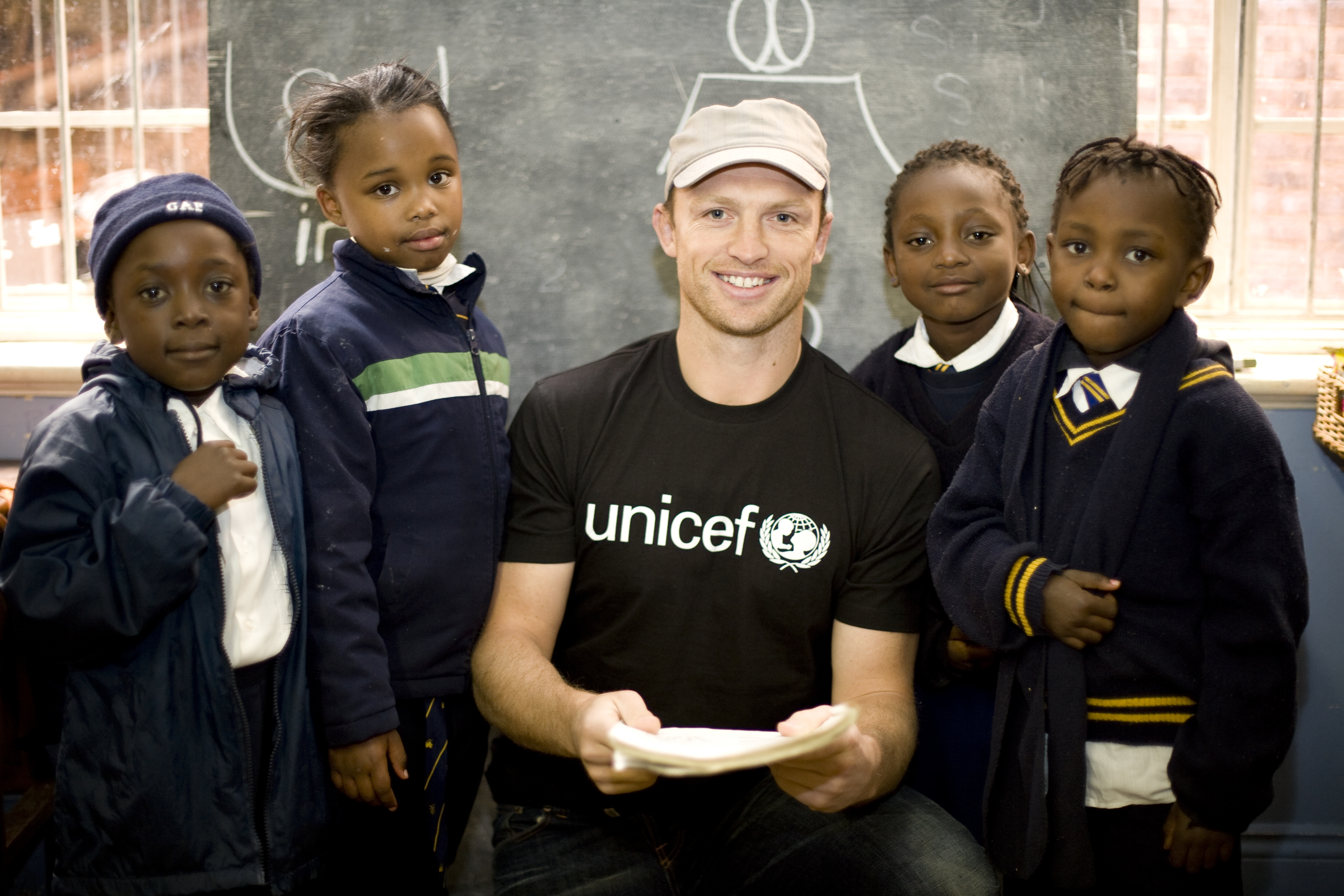
Matt Dawson in Johannesburg with pupils of a UNICEF-funded school

- Tara McDonald 1988 the youngest child ambassador after winning the Danny Kaye Award hosted by Audrey Hepburn
- Manchester United F.C. (1999)
- Robbie Williams (2000)
- Jemima Khan (2001)
- Andrew O'Hagan (2001)
- Martin Bell (2001)
- Alex Ferguson (2002)
- Trudie Styler (2004)
- Paul Clark (2004)
- Ewan McGregor (2004)
- Elle Macpherson (2005)
- James Nesbitt (2006)
- Ryan Giggs (2006)
- Claudia Schiffer (2006)
- Charley Boorman (2008)
- David Puttnam (2009)
- Duncan Bannatyne (2009)
- Orlando Bloom (2009)
- Matt Dawson (2009)
- Cat Deeley (2009)
- Eddie Izzard (July 2013)
- Chris Hoy (October 2013)
- Tom Hiddleston (2013)
- Michael Sheen (October 2014)
- Emma Bunton (2014)
- Millie Bobby Brown (November 2018)
- Rita Ora (May 2019)

=== United States of America (USA) ===
- Laurence Fishburne (1996)
- Sarah Jessica Parker (1998)
- Susan Sarandon (1999)
- Marcus Samuelsson (2000)
- Téa Leoni (2001)
- Alyssa Milano (2003)
- Lucy Liu (2005)
- Dayle Haddon (2007)
- Joel Madden (2008)
- Selena Gomez (2009)
- Vern Yip (November 2010)
- Angie Harmon (January 2013)
- Tyson Chandler (November 2013)
- Katy Perry (December 2013)
- Aidan Gallagher (June 2018)
- Sofia Carson (October 2020)

=== Uruguay ===
- Diego Forlán (2005)
- Natalia Oreiro (September 2011)
- María Noel Riccetto (November 2019)

=== Vanuatu ===
- Vanuatu Women's Beach Volleyball Team (June 2015)

=== Venezuela ===
- FESNOJIV (November 2004)
- Omar Vizquel (December 2008)
- Édgar Ramírez (November 2010)
- Alejandro Cañizales (July 2011)

=== Vietnam ===
- Vũ Nguyễn Hà Anh (August 2010)
- Nguyễn Xuân Bắc (September 2012)

=== Zimbabwe ===
- Prudence Mabhena (October 2011)

== See also ==
- Goodwill Ambassador
- FAO Goodwill Ambassador
- UNDP Goodwill Ambassador
- UNHCR Goodwill Ambassador
- UNESCO Goodwill Ambassador
- UNODC Goodwill Ambassador
- UNFPA Goodwill Ambassador
- UN Women Goodwill Ambassador
- UNIDO Goodwill Ambassador
- WHO Goodwill Ambassador
- United Nations Messengers of Peace
