= United Nations Messengers of Peace =

Highest ranking goodwill ambassador designation of the United Nations

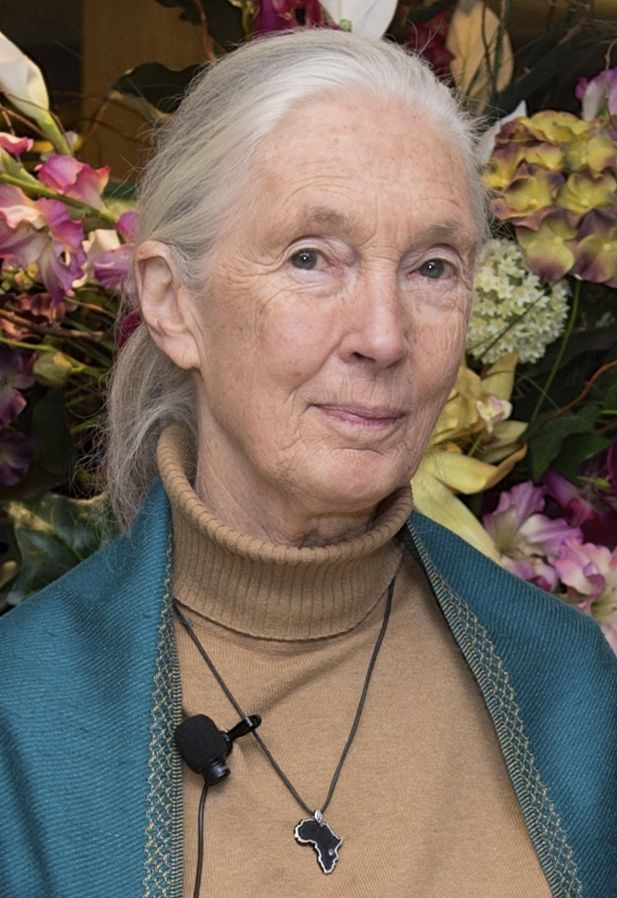
Jane Goodall, 2015

United Nations Messenger of Peace is a special post-nominal honorific title of authority bestowed by the United Nations to "distinguished individuals, carefully selected from the fields of art, music, literature and sports, who have agreed to help focus worldwide attention on the work of the United Nations." Globally, present and past messengers of peace are the only public figures that are or may be legally and diplomatically known as a "United Nations Goodwill Ambassador". Other United Nations goodwill ambassador programmes in the UN system participants assign their title of authority (commission) using the agency name or patent program acronym or abbreviation such as: UN Women Goodwill Ambassador; UNICEF Goodwill Ambassador; UNESCO Goodwill Ambassador; UNAIDS Goodwill Ambassador; and other legal designations following their name.

The messengers are initially chosen to serve for a period of three years; however, all of the current thirteen messengers have served for more than five years, some of them as long as 15 or 20 years. The Messengers of Peace idea was started in 1997 as a central addition to the system of UN goodwill ambassadors and cause advocates, which has been operated by the different UN agencies since 1954, when UNICEF appointed Danny Kaye as its first goodwill ambassador.

Whilst the ambassadors and advocates mainly promote the work of the UN specialized agency or division they were appointed by, a Messenger of Peace is intended to promote the work of the United Nations in general and is commissioned directly by the secretary-general of the United Nations most often with a formal ceremony.

== Current messengers ==
- Michael Douglas – designated 1998
- Yo-Yo Ma – designated 2006
- Princess Haya Bint Al Hussein – designated 2007
- Daniel Barenboim – designated 2007
- Paulo Coelho – designated 2007
- Midori Goto – designated 2007
- Charlize Theron – designated 2008
- Stevie Wonder – designated 2009
- Edward Norton – designated 2010
- Lang Lang – designated 2013
- Leonardo DiCaprio – designated 2014
- Malala Yousafzai – designated 2017

== Former messengers ==
- Enrico Macias – designated 1997
- Muhammad Ali – designated 1998
- Anna Cataldi – designated 1998
- Luciano Pavarotti – designated 1998
- Elie Wiesel – designated 1998
- Vijay Amritraj – designated 2001
- Wynton Marsalis – designated 2001
- Jane Goodall – designated 2002
- George Clooney – designated 2008
- Wangari Maathai – designated 2009

== See also ==
- Goodwill Ambassador
- FAO Goodwill Ambassador
- UNDP Goodwill Ambassador
- UNHCR Goodwill Ambassador
- UNESCO Goodwill Ambassador
- UNODC Goodwill Ambassador
- UNFPA Goodwill Ambassador
- UN Women Goodwill Ambassador
- UNIDO Goodwill Ambassador
- UNICEF Goodwill Ambassador
- WHO Goodwill Ambassador
- United Nations Messengers of Peace
