= WFP Goodwill Ambassador =

Celebrity advocate for the World Food Programme

WFP Goodwill Ambassador is an official postnominal honorific title, title of authority, legal status and job description assigned to those goodwill ambassadors and advocates who are designated by the United Nations. WFP goodwill ambassadors are celebrity representatives of the World Food Programme (WFP) who use their talent and popularity to advocate for hunger and food security.

== Current WFP goodwill ambassadors ==
Current listed and supporting goodwill ambassadors, and the year they were appointed:

Name	Origin	Year	Descriptive Title
Abel "The Weeknd" Tesfaye	Canada	2021	WFP Goodwill Ambassador
Andrew Zimmern	United States	2021	WFP Goodwill Ambassador
Amal Dabbas	Jordan	2010	WFP Goodwill Ambassador
Antoni Porowski	United States	2024	WFP Goodwill Ambassador
Ashley Park	United States	2025	WFP Goodwill Ambassador
Asma Khan	United Kingdom	2022	Chef Advocate for the United Kingdom
Daniel Brühl	Spain / Germany	2021	WFP Goodwill Ambassador
Lucy Hale	United States	2026	WFP Goodwill Ambassador
George Stroumboulopoulos	Canada	2011	WFP Goodwill Ambassador
Hend Sabry	Tunisia / Egypt	2010	WFP Goodwill Ambassador
Hlubi Mboya	South Africa	2008	WFP Goodwill Ambassador
Kate Hudson	United States	2018	WFP Goodwill Ambassador
Kurara Chibana	Japan	2013	WFP Goodwill Ambassador
Manal Al Alem	United Arab Emirates	2017	WFP Goodwill Ambassador
Michael Kors	United States	2015	WFP Goodwill Ambassador
Tamim Iqbal	Bangladesh	2020	WFP Goodwill Ambassador
Arthur Potts Dawson	United Kingdom	2018	WFP Chef Advocate
Feike Sijbesma	Netherlands	2021	WFP Champion
Zeina Barhoum	Jordan	2020	WFP Advocate

== See also ==
- Goodwill Ambassador
- FAO Goodwill Ambassador
- UNDP Goodwill Ambassador
- UNESCO Goodwill Ambassador
- UNHCR Goodwill Ambassador
- UNODC Goodwill Ambassador
- UNFPA Goodwill Ambassador
- UNIDO Goodwill Ambassador
- UNICEF Goodwill Ambassador
- UN Women Goodwill Ambassador
- WHO Goodwill Ambassador
