= Maya Ghazal =

Syrian refugee and UNHCR goodwill ambassador

Maya Ghazal (Arabic: مايا غزال) is a UK-based Syrian refugee, a UNHCR Goodwill Ambassador, one of the first female Syrian refugee pilots, and a Diana Award winner.

In 2019, Maya Ghazal became one of the first Syrian refugee women to earn a pilot license.

== Early life in Syria ==
Ghazal was born to a father who ran a fabric factory on the outskirts of Damascus and has two brothers.

The Syrian civil war started in 2011, when she was 12 years old.

== Life in the United Kingdom ==
In September 2015, at the age of 16, with her mother and siblings, following the path that her father took, Ghazal fled Syria to Birmingham, UK; later moving to London. In the UK, she struggled to continue her education, because 16 is a legal school-leaving age in the UK, no school was obliged to accept her, and the schools did not respect her Syrian education credentials.

In 2017, Ghazal was one of 20 people to be given a Diana Award.

Ghazal studied aeronautical engineering and pilot education at Brunel University London. In 2020, she became the first female Syrian refugee pilot and in 2021 she became a United Nations High Commissioner for Refugees Goodwill Ambassador.
