= UN Women Goodwill Ambassador =

Celebrity advocate for UN Women

UN Women Goodwill Ambassador is an official postnominal honorific title, title of authority, legal status and job description assigned to those goodwill ambassadors and advocates who are designated by the United Nations. UN Women goodwill ambassadors are celebrity advocates for the United Nations Entity for Gender Equality and the Empowerment of Women also known as UN Women; who use their talent, popularity or fame to assist the UN in better addressing a coordinated, comprehensive response to the interrelated issues of equality and working for the empowerment of women.

In 2011 UNIFEM was merged into UN Women to be redeveloped as a multi focus sub-division of the United Nations. UN Women has enlisted the help of prominent and influential personalities from the worlds of art, music, film, sport and literature to highlight key issues and to draw attention to its activities to promote issues important to women.

== Current UN Women goodwill ambassadors ==
Current listed and supporting goodwill ambassadors, and the year they were appointed:

Name	Origin	References	Descriptive Title
Danai Gurira	Zimbabwe / United States	2018	UN Women Goodwill Ambassador
Nicole Kidman	United States / Australia	2006	UN Women Goodwill Ambassador
Emma Watson	United Kingdom	2014	UN Women Goodwill Ambassador
Anne Hathaway	United States	2016	UN Women Goodwill Ambassador
Marta Vieira da Silva	Brazil	2018	UN Women Goodwill Ambassador for Women and Girls in Sport
Farhan Akhtar	India	2016	Regional UN Women Ambassador for South Asia
HRH Princess Bajrakitiyabha Mahidol	Thailand	2008	UN Women National Ambassador of Thailand
Cindy Sirinya Bishop	United States	2018	Regional UN Women Goodwill Ambassador for Asia and the Pacific
Jaha Dukureh	Gambia	2018	Regional UN Women Ambassador for Africa
Tong Dawei	China	2016	National UN Women Ambassador for China
Sania Mirza	India	2014	Regional UN Women Ambassador for South Asia
Hai Qing	China	2015	National UN Women Ambassador for China
Camila Pitanga	Brazil	2015	National UN Women Ambassador for Brazil
Muniba Mazari	Pakistan	2015	National UN Women Ambassador for Pakistan

== See also ==
- Goodwill Ambassador
- FAO Goodwill Ambassador
- UNDP Goodwill Ambassador
- UNESCO Goodwill Ambassador
- UNFPA Goodwill Ambassador
- UNHCR Goodwill Ambassador
- UNICEF Goodwill Ambassador
- UNIDO Goodwill Ambassador
- UNODC Goodwill Ambassador
- WFP Goodwill Ambassador
- WHO Goodwill Ambassador
