= Iskui Abalyan =

Belarusian singer (born 1970)

- Born: Iskui Mirikauna Abalyan; 23 December 1970 (age 55); Bishkek, Kyrgyz SSR, Soviet Union
- Genres: Pop; jazz
- Occupation: Singer
- Instrument: vocals
- Years active: 1996-present

Iskui Mirikauna Abalyan (Belarusian: Іскуі Мірыкаўна Абалян, Russian: Искуи Мириковна Абалян; born 23 December 1970) is a Belarusian singer. She is a performer of popular repertoire, and also leads music programs and concerts. She has performed in Belarus, Russia, and Ukraine. In 2017, Abalyan was appointed a Goodwill Ambassador for the United Nations High Commissioner for Refugees.

== Biography ==
Abalyan was born on 23 December 1970 in Bishkek, Kyrgyz SSR. She is of Armenian ethnicity. Her father was an architect and her mother worked as a healthcare worker. Abalyan also has a sister named Asmik, who is a designer who lives and works in Moscow. At the age of two, Abalyan and her family moved to Smolensk, where she graduated from high school, studied at a music school and, from 1986 to 1990, at the Smolensk Music School in the theory of music class. In 1990, she settled in the Belarusian SSR and studied at the Belarusian State Conservatory (later the Belarusian State Academy of Music). In 1995, she graduated from this university with the specialty of choir conductor, lecturer in choir disciplines. She worked as a choir director at the Mogilev High School of Music and Choreography, a soloist of the "Remiks" studio of the Mogilev Regional Philharmonic. She has the title of artist-vocalist of the higher category of the Mogilev Regional Philharmonic.

She started her musical career in 1996, winning the TV competition "Zornaja rostan". At the "Pamukkale 1997" competition in Turkey, she received a FIDOF diploma for significant creative potential. Its repertoire is based on popular songs performed mainly in Russian and English, less often in Belarusian, Armenian, Italian and French. Her best-known songs include Etoprost lubov, Posledniye derevni, Vechnaya vesna, Tvoya glazur, Khoroshaya plodovitost (with A. Patlis), Diyevuszka ukhodit iz doma, and Serdtse Botsia. She has performed in Belarus, Russia, and Ukraine. She represented Belarus in the International Competition of Young Stage Song Performers "Slavic Bazaar" (Vitebsk, 1996), participated in the festivals "Złoty Szlagier" (Mohilev, 1997, 1998), "Discovery 1998" (Varna, Bulgaria). She acts as an expert in the project Ja poju (eng. I sing).

Abalyan is the winner of three awards and the audience award of the International Competition for Young Performers "Vilnius 1996", the winner of the Grand Prix of the competition of young performers at the festival "Złoty Szlagier 1997" and the winner of the first prize of the International Song Contest "Discovery 1998".

== Musical style ==
According to Lilia Kamlyuk from the magazine "Narodnaya Hazieta", Abalyan has developed her own unique style in the way she performs songs, dresses and behaves with the audience. Abalyan claims that during her performances, she is open to experimentation and allows almost everything, including the grotesque and humor.

== Personal life ==
Abalyan's first husband was Belarusian music producer Andrei Kalina, and in 1999, her first daughter Ksenia was born. In 2014, Abalyan got married for the second time and a year later, gave birth to her second daughter.

In 2004, Abalyan moved to Minsk, where she currently resides.
