= Nizan Guanaes =

Brazilian advertising executive (born 1958)

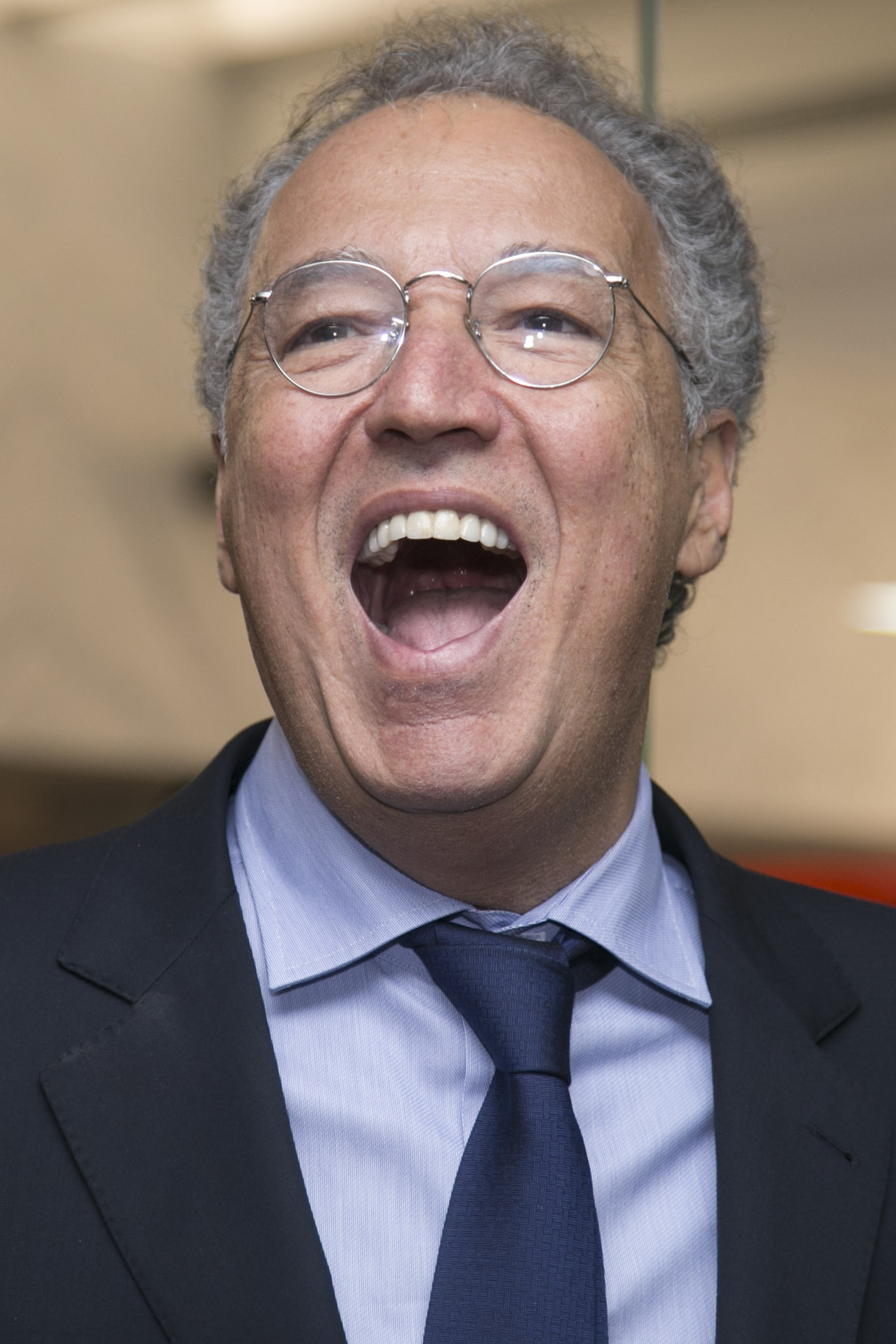
- Nizan Guanaes, participated in the Global Citizen 2017 event, where the speaker was Barack Obama 44th President of the United States of America, in São Paulo (SP) - Brazil
- Born: May 9, 1958 (age 68); Salvador, Bahia
- Occupations: Co-founder and partner of Grupo ABC - ABC Group
- Spouse: Donata Meirelles

Nizan Mansur de Carvalho Guanaes Gomes, UNESCO Goodwill Ambassador (born May 9, 1958 in Salvador) is a Brazilian businessman, philanthropist, and advertising executive.

He is the founder and CEO of N.ideias, a strategy company that works for some of Brazil’s largest and most important companies

He was a co-founder and partner of ABC Group, which was sold to the Omnicom Group in 2015, in the largest transaction in the Brazilian advertising market.

Nizan was voted one of the five most influential Brazilians in the world by Financial Times in 2010; he was named one of the 100 most creative people in the world by Fast Company in 2011; and in 2014, he was named Man of the Year in the Leadership category by GQ.

In 2021, Nizan received the highest national honor, the Order of Rio Branco, for his services to the country in the business and social fields.

== Biography ==
Nizan Guanaes was born in 1958, in Salvador, Bahia. He studied at Colégio Marista and graduated from Universidade Federal da Bahia with a degree in business administration. He began his career as a copywriter in his home city. Years later, he moved to Rio de Janeiro and worked at Artplan, a Brazilian advertising agency. When he moved to São Paulo in 1985, he built a reputation as a skilled advertising copywriter at DPZ and W/GGK, nowadays W/McCann.

In 1988, he won the Gold Lion award at Cannes Festival for the memorable television advertisement “Hitler,” created for the newspaper Folha de S.Paulo – considered one of the 100 best advertisements of all time. In the next year, he bought and took over DM9, advertising agency of Duda Mendonça. The agency was associated with DDB, becoming DM9DDB in 1997. In 2000, DM9 was acquired by DDB Worldwide.

In the same year, Guanaes founded internet portal iG, the second largest free internet portal in Brazil. Two years later, in 2002, Nizan created ABC Group with business partner João Augusto (Guga) Valente with Icatu Group as an investor.

In 2004, with Oskar Metsavaht, he founded the Association of Entrepreneurs Friends of UNESCO focusing to promote quality public education, culture and conserve the national historical heritage.

Since 2010, Nizan is a member in high level commission of UNAIDS, a program from United Nations (UN) that creates and debates solutions to prevent HIV.

Nizan is also a member of following non-profitable foundations: Clinton Global Initiative, created by Bill Clinton, with the stated mission to "strengthen the capacity of people to meet the challenges of global interdependence"; World Economic Forum, based in Switzerland and committed to engage leaders of society to shape global agendas, including health and environment; Endeavor, that identify valuable entrepreneurs to world’s sustainable growth; and Women in the World Foundation, that helps non-governmental organization (NGOs) offer solutions to build a better life for women and girls. Nizan also contributed to create, in 2011, the Together for Girls,” a project developed to identify and combat sexual violence against girls and its social effects.

Nizan writes in Folha de S.Paulo on Tuesdays, every 14 days, on “Market” session.

=== Founder of ABC Group ===
ABC Group was founded by Nizan Guanaes and Guga Valente in March, 2002. The holding company comprises 18 companies such as Africa, DM9DDB, DM9 Rio, DM9 Sul, Escala, Loducca, Morya, Música Comunicação e Marketing, Pereira & O’Dell, b!ferraz, Interbrand, NewStyle, Rocker Heads, Sunset, Agência Tudo and CDN.

In the same year, Nizan founded Africa, middle marketing agency with four partners of DDB Brazil and Icatu Bank. In 2015, Africa is considered one of the ten largest advertising agencies in Brazil.

== Recognition ==
In 2000, Nizan Guanaes received a gold medal in Rio Branco Order given by Brazilian ex-president, Fernando Henrique Cardoso. The Rio Branco Order is a commendation that awards important services and civic virtues in Brazil.

Nizan was voted the Entrepreneur of the Year in Ernst & Young Brazil in 2008. Later that year, through one of his companies, the N-Idéias, he was the mastermind of Rio Summer, a high-summer fashion week.

In 2009, he was chosen the Communication Entrepreneur of the Year by Revista IstoÉ.

In 2010, he was voted one of the five most influential Brazilians by Financial Times.

In the next year, he was nominated one of the most influential professionals in media and marketing by Advertising Age, an American magazine considered one of the most respectful in advertising field.

Also in 2011, he was voted one of the world’s 100 most creative people by Fast Company, an American magazine of business and technology.

In may 2021, Nizan was named UNESCO Goodwill Ambassador. This title was awarded to him for the support he has given to UNESCO's actions in the field of education, social inclusion and the empowerment of vulnerable groups.

In 2013, was indicated by Exame magazine as one of the sixteen Brazilians entrepreneurs convicted to make history, as a businessman and creative advertiser.

In 2014, he was the Man of The Year, in Leadership’s category by GQ, an American magazine focused on men’s lifestyle. In the same year he was voted for the third time the most trustworthy advertiser, according to the 13th Research of Reliable Brands, by Seleções magazine and the Brazilian Institute of Public Opinion and Statistics (IBOPE).

In December 2014, he won the Jeca Tatu award at 9th Copywriters Encounter, which awards the Best professionals of Brazilian advertising.

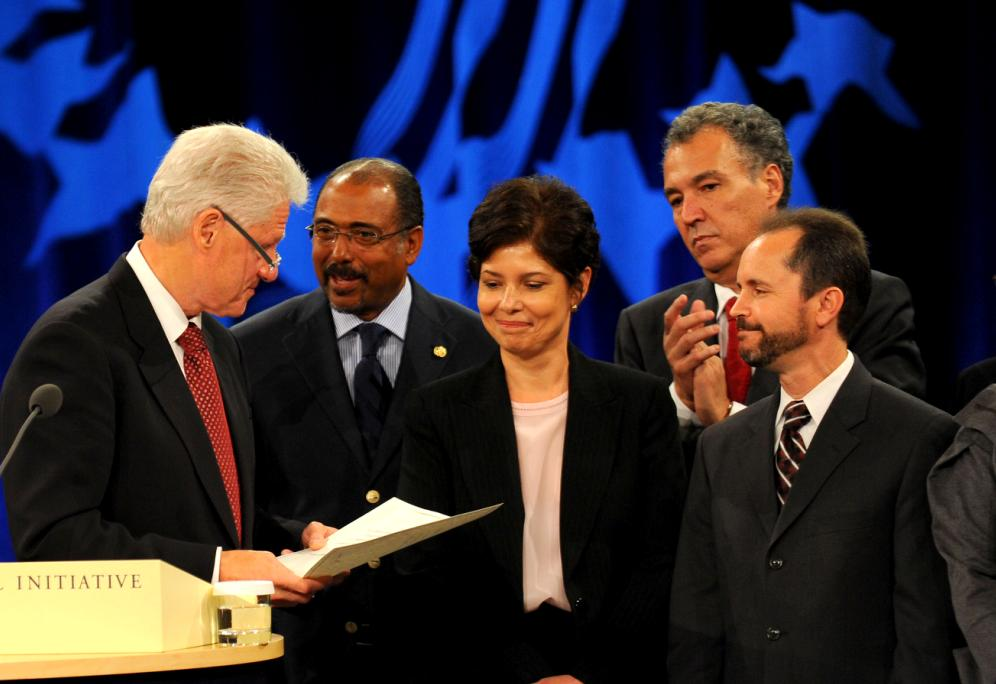
Clinton Global Initiative (CGI) - September 24, 2009

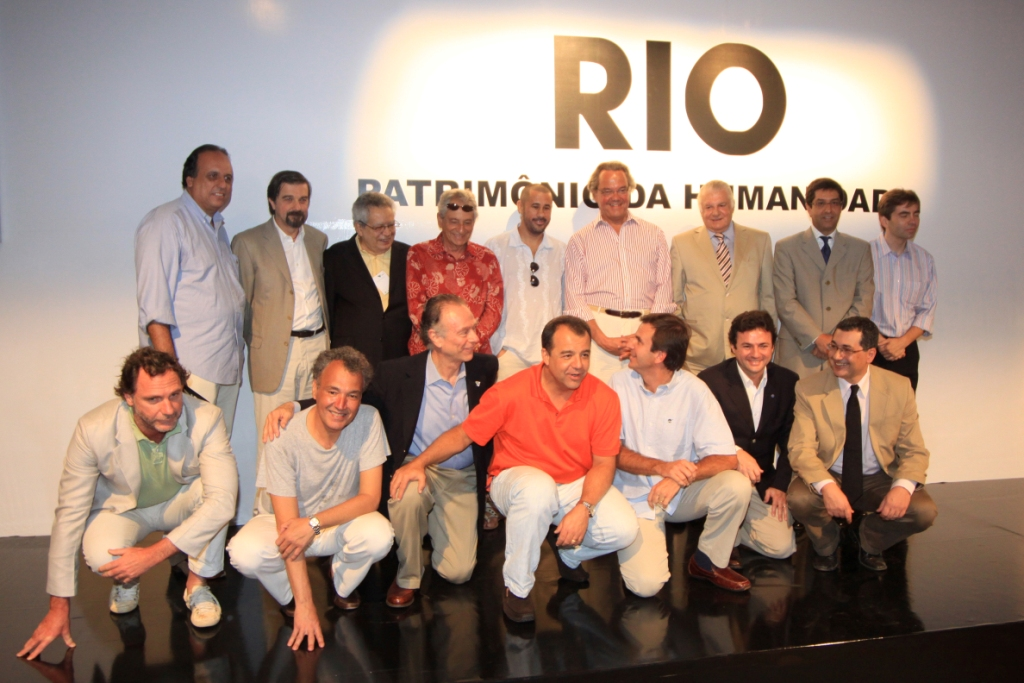
Support to social causes in Rio de Janeiro - October 24, 2008

== Personal life ==
Nizan Guanaes has one son, Antonio Guanaes. He is married to Donata Meirelles, fashion director at Vogue Brazil.
