= UNODC Goodwill Ambassador =

Celebrity advocate of the United Nations Office on Drugs and Crime

UNODC Goodwill Ambassador is an official postnominal honorific title, title of authority, legal status and job description assigned to those who are designated by the United Nations. UNODC goodwill ambassadors are celebrity advocates of the United Nations Office on Drugs and Crime and use their talent, popularity or fame to assist the UN in better addressing a coordinated, comprehensive response to the interrelated issues of illicit trafficking in and abuse of drugs, crime prevention and criminal justice, international terrorism, and political corruption.

The UNODC goodwill ambassador program has enlisted the help of prominent personalities from the worlds of art, music, film, sport and literature to highlight key issues and to draw attention to its activities in the fight against illicit drugs and international crime.

== Current UNODC goodwill ambassadors ==
Current listed and supporting goodwill ambassadors, and the year they were appointed:

Name	Location	References	Notes
Nadia Murad	Iraq	2015	Goodwill Ambassador for the Dignity of Survivors of Human Trafficking
Nicolas Cage	United States	2010	Goodwill Ambassador for Global Justice
Shehzad Roy	Pakistan	2017	National Goodwill Ambassador for Pakistan
Ozark Henry	Belgium	2015	National Goodwill Ambassador for Belgium against Human Trafficking
Princess Bajrakitiyabha Mahidol	Thailand	2017	Goodwill Ambassador on the Rule of Law for Southeast Asia
Coumba Gawlo	Senegal	2016	Goodwill Ambassador against Trafficking in Persons and Smuggling of Migrants
Radamel Falcao	Colombia	2013	Goodwill Ambassador for the Fight Against Drugs
Mira Sorvino	United States	2013	Goodwill Ambassador for Global Fight Against Human Trafficking
Ross Bleckner	United States	2009	Goodwill Ambassador to Combat Human Trafficking
Shahid Afridi	Pakistan	2011	Goodwill Ambassador to Combat Drug Use Among the Youth

== See also ==
- Goodwill Ambassador
- FAO Goodwill Ambassador
- UNDP Goodwill Ambassador
- UNHCR Goodwill Ambassador
- UNESCO Goodwill Ambassador
- UNFPA Goodwill Ambassador
- UN Women Goodwill Ambassador
- UNIDO Goodwill Ambassador
- UNICEF Goodwill Ambassador
- WFP Goodwill Ambassador
- WHO Goodwill Ambassador
