= UNDP Goodwill Ambassador =

United Nations honorific role

UNDP Goodwill Ambassador is an official postnominal honorific title, title of authority, legal status and job description assigned to those goodwill ambassadors and advocates who are designated by the United Nations. The United Nations Development Programme (UNDP) along with other United Nations agencies, has long enlisted the voluntary services and support of prominent individuals as goodwill ambassadors to advocate these causes. Their fame helps amplify the urgent and universal message of human development and international cooperation, helping to accelerate the achievement of the Millennium Development Goals. They articulate the UNDP development philosophy and programmes of self-reliant opportunities and motivate people to act in the interest of improving their own lives and those of their fellow citizens.

== Current UNDP Goodwill Ambassadors ==
The following individuals serve as UNDP Goodwill Ambassadors and advocates:

- Antonio Banderas
- Bob Weir
- Cody Simpson
- Connie Britton
- Didier Drogba
- Crown Prince Haakon Magnus of Norway
- Iker Casillas
- Marta Vieira da Silva
- Misako Konno
- Michelle Yeoh
- Nikolaj Coster-Waldau
- Olafur Eliason
- Padma Lakshmi
- The Roca Brothers
- Match Against Poverty: Zinedine Zidane, Ronaldo
- Yemi Alade

== See also ==
- Goodwill Ambassador
- FAO Goodwill Ambassador
- UNHCR Goodwill Ambassador
- UNESCO Goodwill Ambassador
- UNODC Goodwill Ambassador
- UNFPA Goodwill Ambassador
- UNIDO Goodwill Ambassador
- UNICEF Goodwill Ambassador
- UN Women Goodwill Ambassador
- WFP Goodwill Ambassador
- WHO Goodwill Ambassador
