= UNFPA Goodwill Ambassador =

Celebrity advocate of the United Nations Population Fund mission

UNFPA Goodwill Ambassador is an official postnominal honorific title, title of authority, legal status and job description assigned to those goodwill ambassadors and advocates who are designated by the United Nations. UNFPA goodwill ambassadors are celebrity advocates of the United Nations Population Fund (UNFPA) and use their talent and fame to advocate for the human right of reproductive health.

== Current UNFPA goodwill ambassadors ==
The current goodwill ambassadors, and the year they were appointed:

| Ambassador | Country | Date |
|---|---|---|
| H.R.H. Crown Princess Mary of Denmark | Denmark | 2010 |
| Ashley Judd | United States | 2016 |
| Goedele Liekens | Belgium | 2000 |
| Queen Mother Ashi Sangay Choden Wangchuck | Bhutan | 1999 |
| Catarina Furtado | Portugal | 2000 |
| Maria Efrosinina | Ukraine | 2018 |
| Princess Basma bint Talal | Jordan | 2001 |
| Natalia Vodianova | Russia | 2021 |
| Hodan Said Isse | Puntland | 2019 |

== See also ==
- Goodwill Ambassador
- FAO Goodwill Ambassador
- UNDP Goodwill Ambassador
- UNHCR Goodwill Ambassador
- UNESCO Goodwill Ambassador
- UNODC Goodwill Ambassador
- UN Women Goodwill Ambassador
- UNIDO Goodwill Ambassador
- UNICEF Goodwill Ambassador
- WFP Goodwill Ambassador
- WHO Goodwill Ambassador
