= Gavin Rajah =

South African born fashion and interior designer (born 1970)

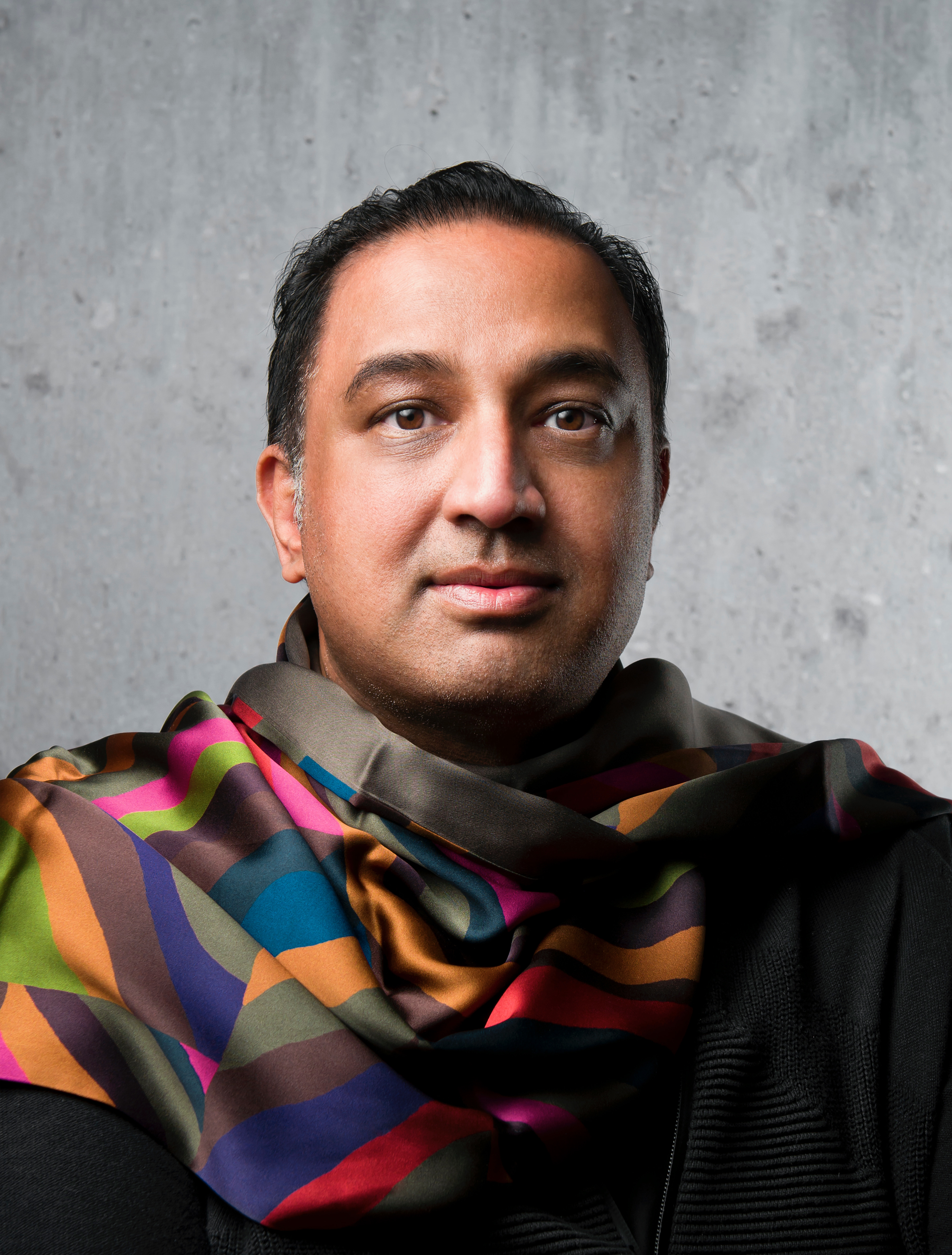
- South African Fashion Designer and Philanthropist
- Born: 20 July 1970 (age 55)
- Website: https://www.gavinrajah.com

Gavin Rajah is a South African born fashion and interior designer. He was born in Durban and spent his childhood there. He is the founder of Gavin Rajah Atelier and The Whitelight Movement, an organization that does skills training and work placement with women who are survivors of sexual abuse and/or domestic violence. Rajah is also known for his work in events, particularly those of an educational or philanthropic nature.

== Career ==
Rajah initially studied law at the University of Cape Town beginning in 1989. While at university he sold reject clothing from the United States clothing label his father represented. Anti-apartheid sanctions saw an end to the American label selling in South Africa and Rajah then befriended a local seamstress whose clothes he began selling.

Rajah gave up law to focus on fashion. The release of Nelson Mandela from prison on February 10, 1990 and the unbanning of political organizations led to rapid relaxations on business ownership for black South Africans. Rajah assisted Mandela with fundraising events for the opening of the Mandela Children’s Fund offices in the United Kingdom and United States of America, as well as sites in South Africa.

Rajah founded Cape Town Fashion Week in 2000 and became the first African brand to be invited by the Chambre Syndicale de la Couture in France to show at Paris Fashion Week (Couture) in 2006. He partners with the Motsepe Family Foundation to promote the development of young black fashion designers and entrepreneurs in South Africa and other African nations. He also works with major South African retailer, Pick ’n Pay on a mentorship program for young black designers. He worked with South Africa’s Special Envoy for Gender, Geraldine Fraser-Moleketi to develop a skill transfer and micro-enterprise network in the clothing and textile sector in Africa. He has shown collections in New York, Paris, Germany, the United Kingdom and India.

In recent years he has extended design to homewear often drawing on the skills of famous African artists, including his collaboration with Zanele Muholi.

== Philanthropy ==
A board member of the Harvard University Center for Africa since August 2016, he helped the Center launch an African office in Johannesburg, South Africa. He has worked with the Center in organizing and fundraising for four conferences on: Africa’s Leaders Speak (2018; Africa-Asia Partnerships in Health and Healthcare Delivery for Women and Youth (2019; Women and the Changing Face of Entrepreneurship in Africa (2020); and Future of Curatorial Practice in Africa (2022). He is a director of the African Womxn Award in association with the Harvard Center for Africa and is an advisory member on Harvard Art’s Initiative.

Rajah has been an active United Nations Children’s Fund Goodwill Ambassador since 2017. In 2018, he founded The White Light Movement, a non-profit organization in South Africa that helps women and girls harmed by domestic violence and/or sexual abuse.

He works out of his atelier at 100 Shortmarket St, Cape Town City Centre, Cape Town.
