= FAO Goodwill Ambassador =

Celebrity advocate of the United Nations Food and Agriculture Organization's mission

FAO Goodwill Ambassador is an official postnominal honorific title, title of authority, legal status and job description assigned to goodwill ambassadors and advocates who are designated by the United Nations. FAO goodwill ambassadors are celebrity advocates of the Food and Agriculture Organization of the United Nations who use their talent and fame to advocate for the organization.

Food and Agriculture Organization of the United Nations emblem with its Latin motto, Fiat Panis ("Let there be bread")

The Goodwill Ambassador Programme of the Food and Agriculture Organization of the United Nations has been in place since 1999. The main purpose of the programme is to increase public awareness and to disseminate information on issues related to food security and hunger.

FAO encourages its goodwill ambassadors to actively use their talents and influence, and to commit themselves personally and professionally, to assist the organization in raising public awareness of the urgent need to eradicate hunger, malnutrition and food insecurity, and in achieving the 2030 Sustainable Development Goals.

== Types of FAO Goodwill Ambassadors ==
FAO has three types of Goodwill Ambassadors:

- The FAO Global Goodwill Ambassador, who are worldwide known celebrities from the worlds of arts, sports, literature, sciences and other fields of public importance.
- The FAO Special Goodwill Ambassador, who are high-level personalities usually from the field of research or science, who have excelled in an area relevant to the one for which they become special Ambassadors.
- The FAO National Goodwill Ambassador, who are personalities with local appeal, the work of which they support mainly within the country of their nomination.

== Current FAO Goodwill Ambassadors ==
Current goodwill ambassadors, and the year they were appointed:

Name	Location	References	Notes
Queen Letizia	Spain	2015	Special Goodwill Ambassador for Nutrition
King Letsie III	Lesotho	2016	Special Goodwill Ambassador for Nutrition
Darine El-Khatib	Lebanon	2017	Regional Goodwill Ambassador for the Near East and North Africa
Princess Basma bint Ali	Jordan	2016	Regional Goodwill Ambassador for the Near East and North Africa
Princess Maha Chakri Sirindhorn	Thailand	2016	Regional Goodwill Ambassador for Asia and the Pacific
Katsuhiro Nakamura	Japan	2017	National Goodwill Ambassador for Asia and the Pacific
Hiroko Kuniya	Japan	2017	National Goodwill Ambassador for Asia and the Pacific
Diarmuid Gavin	Ireland	2022	National Goodwill Ambassador for Europe
Rodrigo Pacheco	Ecuador	2022	National Goodwill Ambassador for Latin America and the Caribbean

== Former FAO Goodwill Ambassadors ==
Former goodwill ambassadors, and the year they were appointed:

Name	Location	References	Notes
Thomas Pesquet	France	2021	
Miriam Makeba	South Africa	1999	
Dee Dee Bridgewater	United States	1999	
Gina Lollobrigida	Italy	1999	
Rita Levi-Montalcini	Italy	1999	
Gong Li	Singapore	2000	
Youssou N'Dour	Senegal	2000	
Gilberto Gil	Brazil	2001	
Majida El Roumi	Lebanon	2001	
Albano Carrisi	Italy	2001	
Mory Kanté	Guinea	2001	
Debbie Ferguson-McKenzie	Bahamas	2002	
Roberto Baggio	Italy	2002	
Massimo Ranieri	Italy	2002	
Dionne Warwick	United States	2002	
Italian Singers’ Soccer Team	Italy	2002	
Khaled	Algeria	2003	
Maná	Mexico	2003	
Noa	Israel	2003	
Justine Pasek	Panama, Poland	2003	
Oumou Sangaré	Mali	2003	
Raúl	Spain	2004	
Carla Fracci	Italy	2004	
Ronan Keating	Ireland	2005	
Beatrice Faumuina	New Zealand	2005	
Chucho Valdés	Cuba	2006	
María Gloria Penayo De Duarte	Paraguay	2006	Extraordinary Ambassador
Suzanne Mubarak	Egypt	2008	
Carl Lewis	United States	2009	
Anggun	Indonesia, France	2009	
Margarita Cedeño de Fernández	Dominican Republic	2009	
Pierre Cardin	France	2009	
Fanny Lu	Colombia	2009	
Raoul Bova	Italy	2010	
Susan Sarandon	United States	2010	
Celine Dion	Canada	2010	
Lea Salonga	Philippines	2010	
Patrick Vieira	France	2010	
Jeremy Irons	United Kingdom	2011	
Evo Morales	Bolivia	2012	Special Ambassador to the FAO for the International Year of Quinoa
Prince Laurent of Belgium	Belgium	2014	Special Ambassador to the FAO for Forests and the Environment
Leyla Aliyeva	Azerbaijan	2015	
Abdelouahab Zaid	United Arab Emirates	2015	
Bharrat Jagdeo	Guyana	2015	Special Ambassador to the FAO for Forests and the Environment
Joyce Boye	Canada	2016	Special Ambassador to the FAO for the International Year of Pulses
Kadambot Siddique	India	2016	Special Ambassador to the FAO for the International Year of Pulses
Maggie Habib	Egypt	2016	Special Ambassador to the FAO for the International Year of Pulses
Jenny Chandler	United Kingdom	2016	Special Ambassador to the FAO for the International Year of Pulses
Patricia Juárez Arango	Mexico	2016	Special Ambassador to the FAO for the International Year of Pulses
Elizabeth Mpofu	Zimbabwe	2016	Special Ambassador to the FAO for the International Year of Pulses
Carlo Petrini	Italy	2016	Special Ambassador to the FAO for Zero Hunger
Guadalupe Valdez	Dominican Republic	2016	Special Ambassador to the FAO for Zero Hunger
Kanayo F. Nwanze	Nigeria	2017	Special Ambassador to the FAO for Zero Hunger

== See also ==
- Goodwill Ambassador
- FAO Goodwill Ambassador
- UNDP Goodwill Ambassador
- UNHCR Goodwill Ambassador
- UNESCO Goodwill Ambassador
- UNODC Goodwill Ambassador
- UNFPA Goodwill Ambassador
- UNIDO Goodwill Ambassador
- UNICEF Goodwill Ambassador
- WFP Goodwill Ambassador
- WHO Goodwill Ambassador
