= UNHCR Goodwill Ambassador =

Celebrity advocate of the United Nations High Commissioner for Refugees' (UNHCR) mission

UNHCR Goodwill Ambassador is an official postnominal honorific title, title of authority, legal status and job description assigned to those goodwill ambassadors and advocates who are designated by the United Nations. UNHCR goodwill ambassadors are celebrity representatives of the Office of the UN High Commissioner for Refugees (UNHCR) who use their talent and fame to advocate for refugees.

== Current UNHCR goodwill ambassadors ==
Current goodwill ambassadors and the year they were appointed:

Time	Ambassador	Country	Profession
2025	Karen Wazen	Lebanon United Kingdom	fashion entrepreneur and digital influencer
2024	Theo James	United Kingdom	actor and producer
2023	Mary Maker	South Sudan	teacher, actor and writer
2023	Luis Gerardo Méndez	Mexico	actor and producer
2023	Aseel Omran	Saudi Arabia	actress and singer
2023	Yang Yang	China	administrator, retired short track speed skater, and businesswoman
2021	Raya Abirached	Lebanon	TV presenter and journalist
2021	Tanya Burr	United Kingdom	actress, influencer, and entrepreneur
2021	Alphonso Davies	Canada	footballer
2021	Maya Ghazal	Syria	refugee and pilot
2021	Tahsan Khan	Bangladesh	singer-songwriter and actor
2021	Gugu Mbatha-Raw	United Kingdom	actress
2021	Anita Rani	United Kingdom	journalist and broadcaster
2020	2Baba (Innocent Idibia)	Nigeria	Musician, producer, and entrepreneur
2020	Kwame Annom (Biishville)	Ghana	chef and entrepreneur
2020	Yiech Pur Biel	South Sudan	Olympic athlete
2020	Betty G	Ethiopia	singer and songwriter
2020	Kat Graham	United States	singer and actress
2020	Alfonso Herrera	Mexico	actor
2020	Manizha Sangin	Russia	singer and songwriter
2020	Nomzamo Mbatha	South Africa	Actress, Humanitarian, TV Presenter
2019	Atom Araullo	Philippines	journalist
2019	Helena Christensen	Denmark	model and photographer
2019	Mahira Khan	Pakistan	actress
2019	Leanne Manas	South Africa	television presenter, businesswoman and journalist
2019	Mercy Masika	Kenya	singer and songwriter
2019	Nikki Samonas	Ghana	actress and television host
2018	Emtithal Mahmoud	Sudan	poet
2018	Ben Stiller	United States	actor
2017	Praya Lundberg	Thailand	model and actress
2017	Miyavi	Japan	musician and actor
2017	Neil Gaiman	United Kingdom	writer
2017	Yusra Mardini	Syria	swimmer
2017	Kristin Davis	United States	actor
2017	David Morrissey	United Kingdom	actor
2017	Alessandro Gassman	Italy	actor
2017	Iskui Abalyan	Armenia Belarus	singer
2017	Yasmine Salhi	Tunisia	artiste
2016	Cate Blanchett	Australia	actor
2016	John Abraham	India	actor
2015	Jung Woo-sung	South Korea	actor
2015	Ger Duany	South Sudan	actor and model
2015	Rokia Traore	Mali	singer-songwriter
2015	Sheikha Rima al-Sabah	Kuwait	philanthropist and former journalist
2013	Aidos Sagat	Kazakhstan	singer
2013	Alek Wek	United Kingdom	supermodel
2013	Khaled Hosseini	United States	writer
2007	Jesús Vázquez	Spain	TV presenter
2007	Muazzez Ersoy	Turkey	singer
2006	George Dalaras	Greece	singer
2006	Osvaldo Laport	Uruguay	actor
2003	Julien Clerc	France	singer
2000	Adel Emam	Egypt	actor
1987	Barbara Hendricks	United States	classical singer

=== Other positions ===
- Barbara Hendricks became a Goodwill Ambassador in 1987. She became the first Honorary Lifetime Goodwill Ambassador in 2002, the only person to hold this title.
- Angelina Jolie became a Goodwill Ambassador in 2001. In 2012, she was appointed the Special Envoy to the United Nations High Commissioner for Refugees.

== Past ambassadors ==
- Kris Aquino
- Giorgio Armani
- Đorđe Balašević
- Richard Burton
- Yao Chen
- Nazia Hassan
- Justus Frantz
- Udo Jürgens
- Lady Antebellum
- Sophia Loren
- Princess Märtha Louise of Norway
- James Mason
- Riccardo Muti
- Arja Saijonmaa
- The Schürzenjäger
- Jack Thompson
- Duraid Lahham

== See also ==
- Goodwill Ambassador
- FAO Goodwill Ambassador
- UNDP Goodwill Ambassador
- UNESCO Goodwill Ambassador
- UNODC Goodwill Ambassador
- UNFPA Goodwill Ambassador
- UNIDO Goodwill Ambassador
- UNICEF Goodwill Ambassador
- UN Women Goodwill Ambassador
- WFP Goodwill Ambassador
- WHO Goodwill Ambassador
