= Goodwill ambassador =

Type of title or postnominal honorific suffix

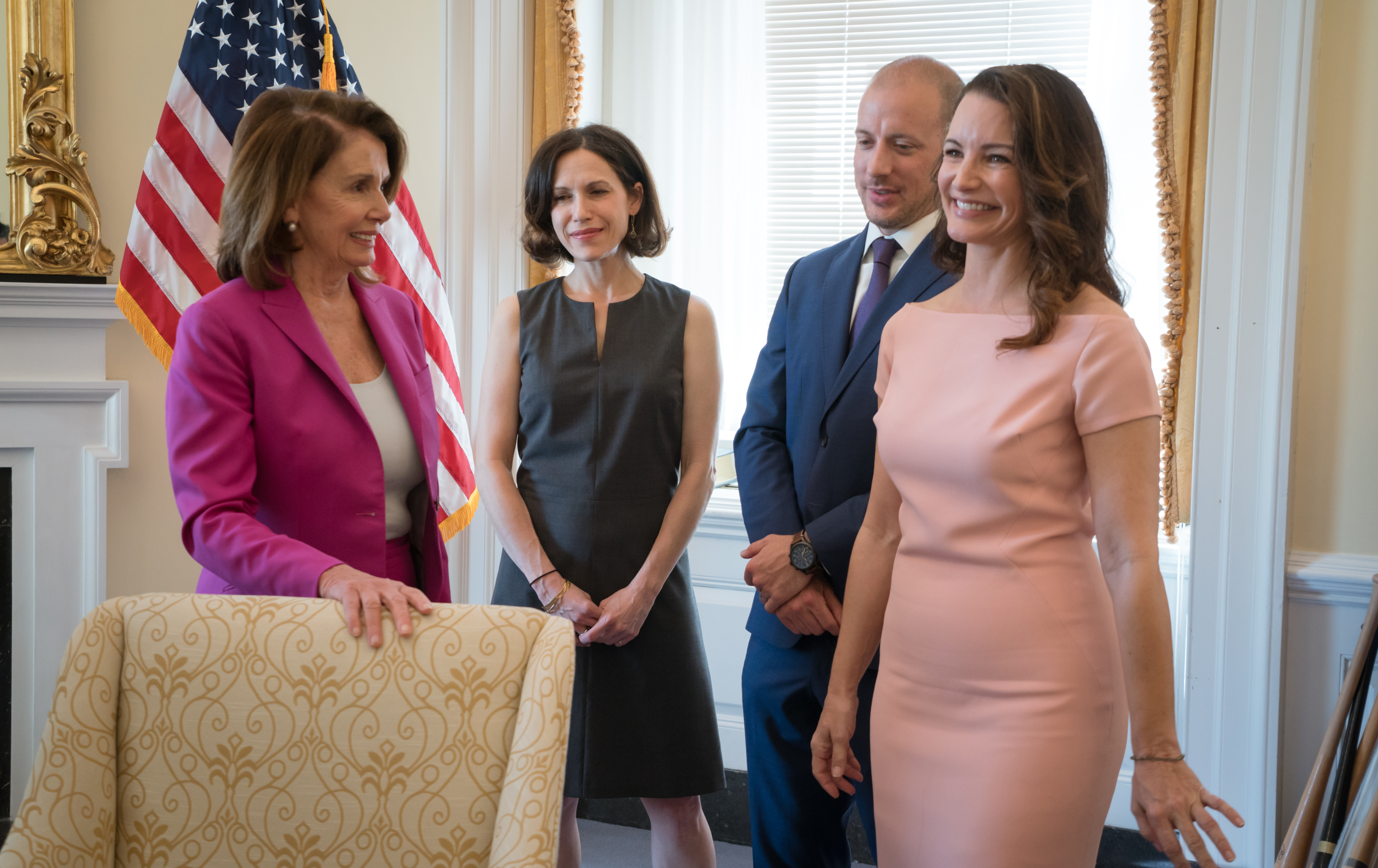
Kristin Davis UNHCR Goodwill Ambassador meeting with Nancy Pelosi

Goodwill ambassador is a post-nominal honorific title, a professional occupation and/or authoritative designation that is assigned to a person who advocates for a specific cause or global issue on the basis of their notability such as a public figure, advocate or an authoritative expert. Sometimes the role of a goodwill ambassador is presented as "Ambassador" or "Goodwill Ambassador" preceding the first and last name, the titled name of the individual is always presented with an organizational, regional or national affiliation. Goodwill ambassadors generally deliver goodwill by promoting ideals or positions from one entity to another, or to a population to establish a benevolent relationship. A goodwill ambassador may be an individual from one country who resides in or travels to another country on a diplomatic mission (or international friendship mission) at a peer to peer level. This can be country to country, state to state, city to city, or as an intermediate emissary representative of the people of a specific organization or cultural group, such as an indigenous tribe, marginalized people or enclave population.

== Introduction ==
Goodwill ambassadors have been a part of governments, institutions and countries for as long as diplomacy has existed. They represent their constituents by traveling abroad exchanging or delivering gifts and presents while bringing awareness to their cause or purpose through public relations activities and organizing events. Goodwill ambassadors are responsible for delivering humanitarian relief, implementing social welfare programs and providing development assistance to demonstrate benevolence and compassion between parties. Most often nation-states, international and non-governmental organizations use well-known celebrities such as actors, actresses, musicians, scientists, authors, former politicians and other high society figures; but they also engage civilians, professionals and government officials to fulfill the role.

Goodwill missions of US states and international nations are usually carried out or overseen by the head of state, but do not necessarily involve official diplomatic credentials beyond a letter of presentation, letters patent, or a letter of credence. It is very rare that a goodwill ambassador is ever issued a diplomatic passport. However, some countries, such as Haiti and Saint Lucia do issue credentials that include diplomatic immunity for goodwill ambassadors and organizations sometimes issue a civil service officer credential or international identification travel document such as a laissez-passer.

Recognition as an authority is designated by an official document that entitles the subject to the use of the honorable title or can be developed over time through social media or public relations. The title is closely associated with the personal name, such as (Angelina Jolie, Goodwill Ambassador) or (Angelina Jolie, UNHCR Goodwill Ambassador) or (Goodwill Ambassador Angelina Jolie). Any regional, state, nation or body politic has the authority to officially designate goodwill ambassadors.

== History ==
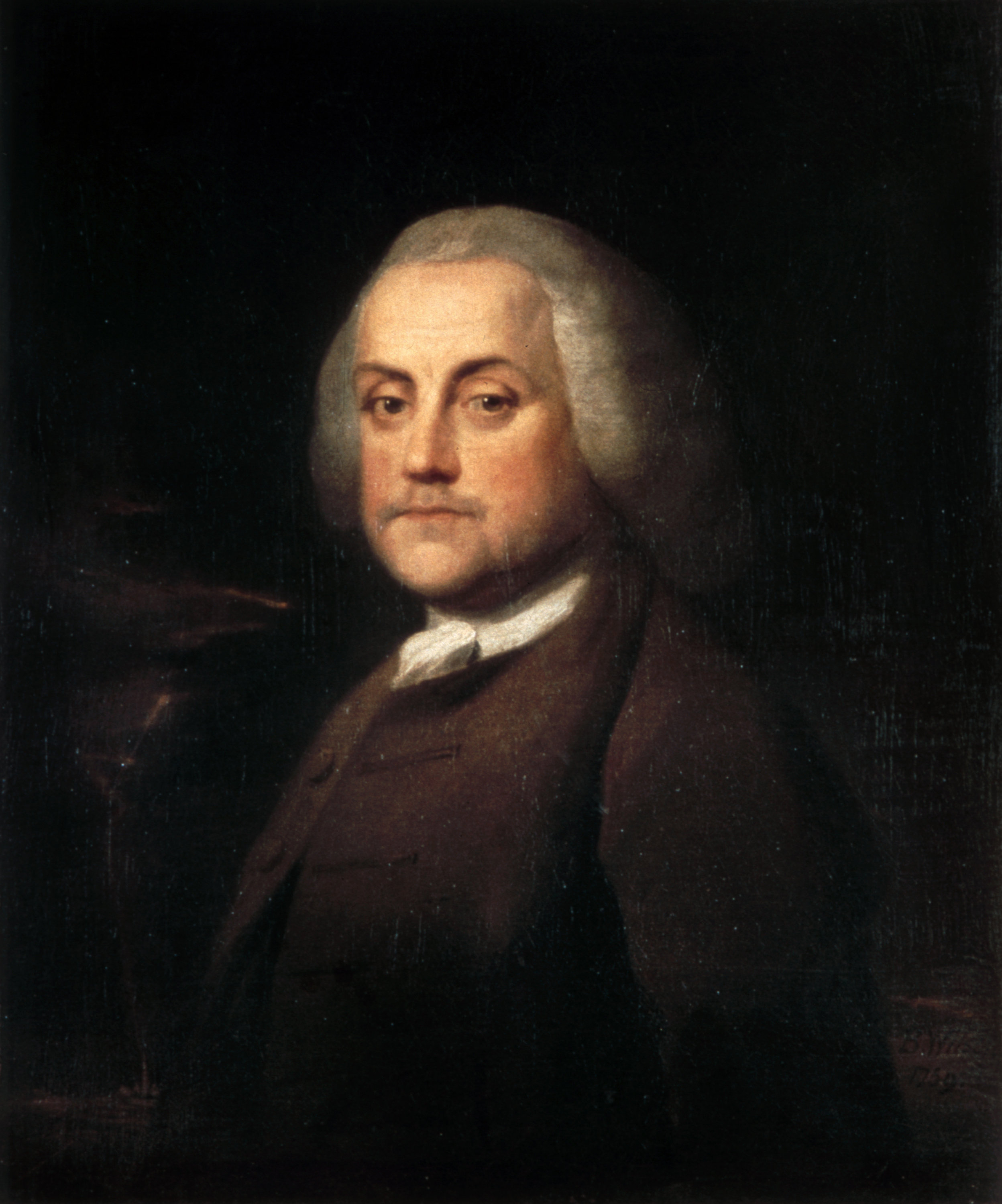
Col. Benjamin Franklin walked in the honorable footsteps of his mentor Cotton Mather forming the first do-good associations in Colonial America.

Many say the first ambassador of good-will was Ambassador Benjamin Franklin on his mission to France in December 1776, when the United States was just a few months old and embroiled in the Revolutionary War. Others might say it was pioneer Daniel Boone who was hired as a civilian colonel to help Col. Judge Richard Henderson build the Wilderness Road and negotiate with good-will the Treaty of Watauga with the Cherokee to establish the Transylvania Colony on May 23, 1775. At its time, the Transylvania Colony was the first democratic government free of British Monarchy calling for a "manly government", Boonesborough had both indigenous and free slaves as civil participants.

Benjamin Franklin in colonial times was also known as Silence Dogood (a pen name) who wrote a series of letters that were published and widely read. Almost 50 years before the American Revolution Franklin adapted; Bonifacius: Essays to Do Good, by the Puritan preacher and family friend Cotton Mather, which Franklin often cited as a key influence throughout his life. His work preached the importance of forming voluntary associations to benefit society. While Franklin learned about forming do-good associations from Cotton Mather, his benevolence, humility and organizational skills made him the most influential force in making voluntarism an enduring part of the American ethos.

=== New understanding ===
The word "good-will" first appears in American newspapers as early as 1789 in the Gazette of the United-States where the term was associated synonymously with words like benevolence, charity, compassion, delight, divinity, grace, honor, humanity, humility, mankind and virtue all in a single thought.

The term "ambassador of good-will" appears in 1920 discussing a delegation of government supported business people from Texas visiting Mexico and establishing friendly business relationships. The article called for "increasing the ranks of ambassadors of good-will" by inviting other businesses and states to their commission. The term "goodwill ambassador" finally emerges into the international landscape as a highly defining and descriptive term in the early 20th Century through a public figure who later proves to be a controversial one. In December 1927 it was applied to aviator and ambassador, Col. Charles Lindbergh by the international news media when he scheduled an International Goodwill Tour visiting Mexico, Central America, Colombia and Venezuela in the Spirit of St. Louis.

The idea was effectively merged from the public domain creating the new term in an article from the Indianapolis Times; "Doll Ambassadors from Japan Viewed by Capital: School Children's Babies Enter U.S. on Mission of Good Will; Washington, December 20, 1927 - Japan's "Doll Ambassadors of Goodwill" received a national welcome..." In subsequent years the idea is used by its commissioners to create an honorary ex-officio civilian post or use the role of goodwill ambassador as an actual representative substitute for the honorary duty of an iconic historical figure, like the Kentucky Colonel. In the 1930s the Kentucky and Tennessee Colonel titles were awarded to people that would make goodwill ambassadors (ambassadors of goodwill) for the state. Elvis Presley, well known as a Goodwill Ambassador for many causes and ideas, was both a Kentucky and Tennessee Colonel, receiving commissions from various governors.

The United States, the United Nations, the Commonwealth of Nations, Latin America, African Nations were all engaged in commissioning goodwill ambassadors to address public relations issues, create soft power, or promote cultural understanding selecting high profile celebrities that are popular within their own society during and after World War II. The entertainers in the USO were all considered to be Goodwill Ambassadors of the United States.

=== Unrelated uses ===
In the 1980s, the Harlem Globetrotters were sometimes known as America's Goodwill Ambassadors especially when performing exposition basketball internationally. In 1998 they registered GOODWILL AMBASSADORS ® under Serial Number #75258888 – with the United States Patent and Trademark Office (USPTO) in the category of education and entertainment services. Based on Harlem Globetrotters International statement the trademark is used in "basketball clinics and exhibitions; and conducting speeches, seminars, and workshops relating to personal awareness, achievement, and motivation." Essentially their trademark blocks anyone in the United States from offering educational or entertainment services using the term [Goodwill Ambassadors].

Unofficially there were the goodwill ambassadors all over the United States with the hosts/hostesses of the Welcome Wagon in the 1960s, 70s and 80s who welcomed new residents with a promotional gift bag, a service provider directory and advertisers coupons from local merchants; section 293.357-018 of the Dictionary of Occupational Titles lists this type of work for the role of a "GOODWILL AMBASSADOR" today. These concessions were often franchised to a local provider in most main-street towns, the person in charge was most informally called or became known as the "goodwill ambassador" of the town.

DOT 293.357-018 - GOODWILL AMBASSADOR: Promotes goodwill and solicits trade for local business firms who are members of parent organization: Develops list of prospective clients from such sources as newspaper items, utility companies' records, and local merchants. Visits homes of new residents, prospective parents, recently married couples, engaged persons, and other prospects to explain and sell services available from local merchants. Usually presents token gifts or gift certificates to induce clients to use local services or purchase local merchandise. Prepares reports of services rendered and visits made for parent organization and member firms. May solicit new organization membership. May explain community services available. May organize clubs and plan parties for new residents.

== United Nations Goodwill Ambassadors ==
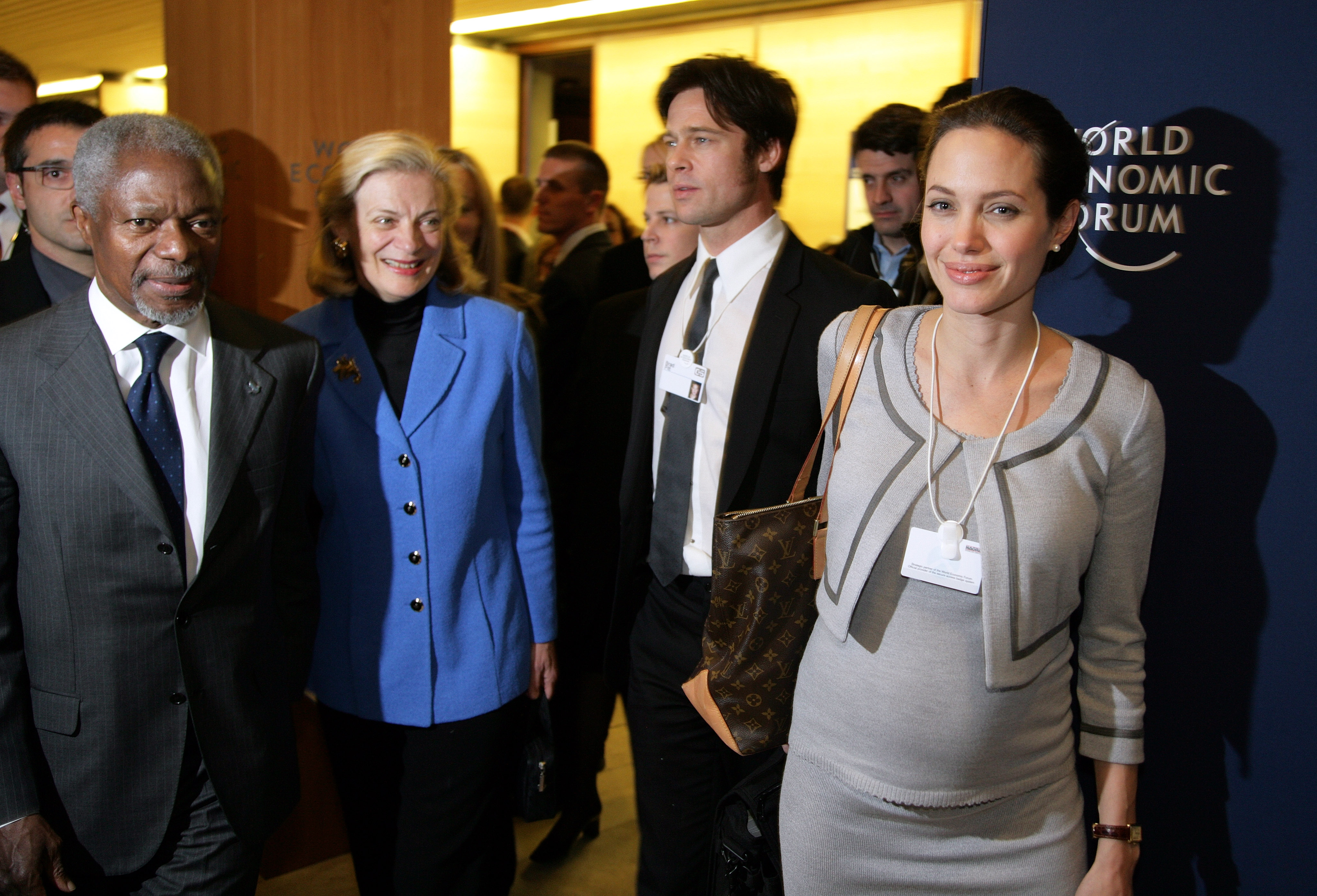
Angelina Jolie, UNHCR Goodwill Ambassador at the World Economic Forum with spouse Brad Pitt and Kofi Annan, secretary-general, United Nations, with his spouse, in Davos, Switzerland, in 2006

According to the United Nations Dag Hammarskjöld Library; "United Nations Goodwill Ambassadors and Messengers of Peace are distinguished individuals, carefully selected from the fields of art, literature, science, entertainment, sports or other fields of public life, who have agreed to help focus worldwide attention on the work of the United Nations. Backed by the highest honor bestowed by the Secretary-General on a global citizen, these prominent personalities volunteer their time, talent and passion to raise awareness of United Nations efforts to improve the lives of billions of people everywhere .. on the other hand, [goodwill ambassadors] are designated by the heads of United Nations Funds, Programmes and specialized Agencies, e.g., UNICEF, the World Food Programme (WFP) and UNHCR. Goodwill Ambassadors are subsequently endorsed by the Secretary-General. .. In 2010, in response to a General Assembly request to mark the International Year of Biodiversity, for the first time the Secretary-General appointed a United Nations Goodwill Ambassador." Celebrity Ambassador's are instrumental in 'marketing' the value of the UN's missions due in large part to their familiarity and likability.

The United Nations agencies appoint and employ popular celebrities to advocate their missions, including the FAO, UNAIDS, UNDP, UNEP, UNFPA, UNODC, UNICEF, UNHCR, UNIDO, UNESCO, the WFP, the WHO, UN Women, the OHCHR, UN-Habitat, and the IMO; all have or may have goodwill ambassadors who are appointed officially by the UN. The largest of these United Nations programs is UNICEF which has over three hundred (300) ambassadors around the world designated by country or region. The United Nations began using goodwill ambassadors officially to promote their missions in 1954, the first was actor Danny Kaye.

The most famous of today's contemporary goodwill ambassadors is Angelina Jolie, who currently serves professionally as a special envoy to the UNHCR and is legally recognized as "Ambassador Angelina Jolie" in being addressed "Her Excellency Angelina Jolie," whereas most other UN goodwill ambassadors are recognized as "Honorable", and use post-nominal titles that are assigned to them.

=== UN goodwill ambassadors (official titles) ===
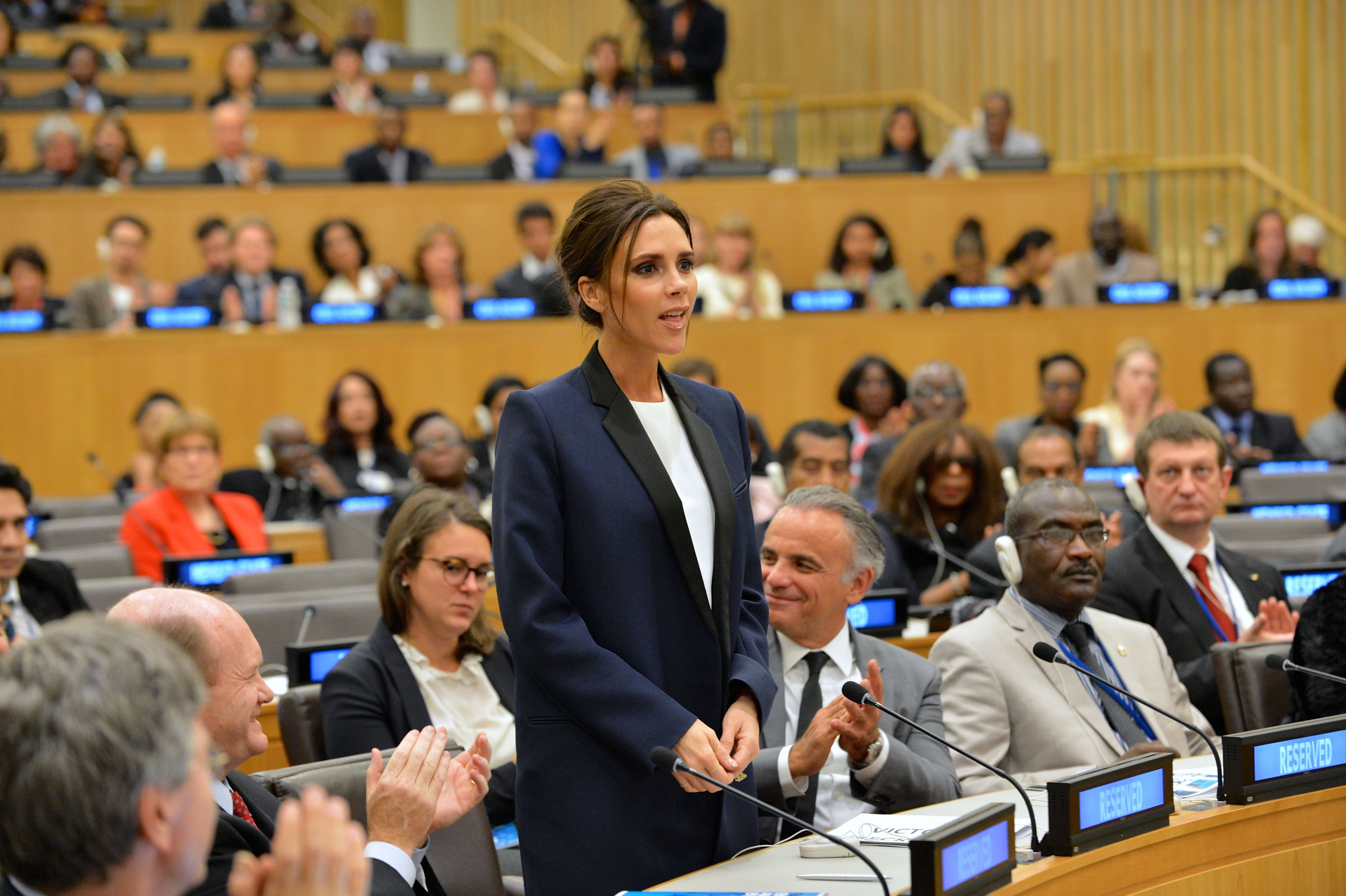
Victoria Beckham, UNAIDS Goodwill Ambassador

In 2020 and 2021 the United Nations began incorporating official standardized titles of authority for credentials, news releases, their websites and semantically on Wikipedia using the initials of each of the specialized agencies of the United Nations followed by the title "Goodwill Ambassador" or the title/term "Advocate" like it did for the SDG Advocates.

Collectively they are all United Nations goodwill ambassadors, each however is designated with a legal title by each individual agency such as:

- FAO Goodwill Ambassador, official title of a goodwill ambassador advocating for the Food and Agricultural Organization
- ILO Goodwill Ambassador, public figure or advocate of the International Labour Organization
- IMO Goodwill Ambassador, or Goodwill Maritime Ambassador, is an expert or advocate of the International Maritime Organization
- IOM Goodwill Ambassador, strategic ally promoting the mandate of the International Organization on Migration
- MP Goodwill Ambassador, Mountain Partnership nominates well-known personalities to champion the cause of sustainable mountain development
- Stop TB Goodwill Ambassador, advocate for the UN Special Envoy of the UN Partnership to Stop Tuberculosis
- UN-Habitat Goodwill Ambassador, advocate of United Nations Habitat commission (urban sustainability)
- UN Women Goodwill Ambassador, celebrity advocate for UN Women (UN Entity for Gender Equality and the Empowerment of Women)
- UNAIDS Goodwill Ambassador, celebrity advocate of the Joint United Nations Programme on HIV/AIDS (UNAIDS)
- UNDP Goodwill Ambassador, prominent individual that serves the mission of the United Nations Development Programme
- UNEP Goodwill Ambassador, public figure or advocate of the United Nations Environmental Programme
- UNESCO Goodwill Ambassador, public figure that advocates for UNESCO
- UNFPA Goodwill Ambassador, celebrity advocate of the United Nations Population Fund mission
- UNHCR Goodwill Ambassador, celebrity advocate of the United Nations High Commissioner for Refugees'
- UNICEF Goodwill Ambassador, local, regional and internationally known public figure that is selected to promote the mission of UNICEF
- UNIDO Goodwill Ambassador, public figure or expert that advocates for the United Nations Industrial Development Organization mission
- UNODC Goodwill Ambassador, celebrity advocate of the United Nations Office on Drugs and Crime
- WFP Goodwill Ambassador, public figure or advocate of the United Nations World Food Programme
- WHO Goodwill Ambassador, a celebrity advocate of the World Health Organization

There are other official title designations and forms of presentation that are used by the United Nations depending on the scope of their public relations campaigns, for example in 2021 the term "UNICEF's women Goodwill Ambassadors" appeared for a UNICEF campaign headline for Afghanistan, however this does not change the official title of individual ambassadors. Since 1999, some of the United Nations Diplomatic Corps and United Nations Association Chapters have referred to their ambassadors as Global Goodwill Ambassador or National Goodwill Ambassador of _________. The new guideline of a 3-6 letter alpha code preceding the "Goodwill Ambassador" title makes each ambassador unique with their proper name, disambiguates different UN departments, projects and programs as well as removes assumptions that fraudsters depend on.

== National goodwill ambassadors ==
Most governments and kingdoms (jurisdictions) have ambassadors of goodwill that are either appointed or known implicitly which promote the objectives and values of a country, nation, state, government or monarchy without promoting political agendas or any official state business. Sometimes "goodwill ambassadors" are created from other ideas that represent, that are positive to social well-being and the general prosperity of a state or nation. The winners of the United States Medal of Freedom are all considered to be goodwill ambassadors for the United States for their lifetime and into history. Being an ambassador of goodwill traditionally includes most individuals competing for a title when a place or organization name is attached, such as winners of prominent scholarships, beauty contests, competitive events and pageants like Miss America, Miss USA, Mister World, Miss Universe, and many others use "goodwill ambassador" as part of their job description.

National goodwill ambassadors are not necessarily celebrities, but are usually very well known on a national scale often within a particular industry for a given period of time. Organizations often use destinations and place names to represent elements, identity, methods, values and virtues of goodwill ambassadorship, however their practice is most often based in public diplomacy, citizen diplomacy or international cooperation.

Official goodwill ambassador representatives of a country, state or nation are designated by the president, prime minister, chancellor, the secretary of state or the head of a cabinet. Governments of countries often recognize the spouse of a president, governor, prime minister or a monarch as goodwill ambassadors such as the First-Lady of the United States, Prince Philip the Duke of Edinburgh for the British Empire, and in the Caribbean country of Belize there is the Special Envoy for Women and Children, all are formally recognized or known as national goodwill ambassadors.

=== United States ===
The United States government does not have a formal, active or organized goodwill ambassador program, but it does have many high-profile public figures that have been recognized with the United States Goodwill Ambassador title as individuals. The US periodically organizes official goodwill ambassador tours and also has a number of agencies that assign the title to selected individuals based on talent, expertise and popularity. Some of the more notable U.S. goodwill ambassadors include Jesse Owens, Kirk Douglas, Lefty Gomez, and Pearl Bailey. The United States also designates particular individuals for roles as emissaries abroad when traveling for a special event supported by the U.S., to deliver foreign aid, participate in a conference or to meet a head-of-state such as the appointment of Jillian "JJ" Simmons United States Goodwill Ambassador to the Republic of the Gambia in 2014. Senators and members of the U.S. Congress also have the authority to designate goodwill ambassadors and representatives of USAID are also known as goodwill ambassadors.

In 1956, the US State Department created the Jazz Ambassadors program, hiring leading American jazz musicians such as Louis Armstrong, Dizzy Gillespie, Benny Goodman, and Duke Ellington to be "ambassadors" for the United States overseas, particularly to improve the public image of the US in the light of criticism from the Soviet Union around racial inequality and racial tension.

=== Saint Lucia ===
Appointments in the Caribbean nation of Saint Lucia are very official with an international goodwill ambassador diplomatic corps of the most well-known citizens under the Ministry of Tourism, Culture and Creative Industries; the title of Goodwill Ambassador is conveyed by the president on the behalf of the sovereign nation. In 2020, Minister Fortuna Belrose stated that those selected for the Saint Lucia Goodwill Ambassador Program will be addressed as "Your Excellency" and receive a goodwill ambassador credential from the government that they can use when traveling, the term of their office will be three years. Separately the Ministry of Tourism maintains a Saint Lucia brand ambassador program for local hospitality tourism which is also aimed to create good-will for the country.

=== Japan ===
In 2008 Japan adopted the cartoon character Hello Kitty as their official goodwill tourism ambassador to China and Hong Kong.

=== Republic of Kosovo ===
Honorary Ambassador of the Republic of Kosovo is a title given to foreign citizens and citizens originating from Kosovo, who have contributed to the national interest of country and use their fame, the award is provided as a state decoration.

== INGO and NGO goodwill ambassadors ==
A wide range of organizations employ goodwill ambassadors to promote their programs and reach out to others based on goodwill relations and benevolence. There are supra governmental organizations such as the African Union and the European Union and international non-governmental organizations like the IUCN and the IOM. Goodwill ambassadors are also used by social and civil society organizations such as Rotary International, the Olympic Games and the Muscular Dystrophy Association.

=== Amnesty International ===
The Ambassador of Conscience Award is Amnesty International's most prestigious human rights award. It celebrates individuals and groups who have furthered the cause of human rights by showing exceptional courage standing up to injustice and who have used their talents to inspire others. It also aims to generate debate, encourage public action and raise awareness of inspirational stories and human rights issues.

=== Civil society award programs ===
Numerous governmental and nongovernmental organizations employ goodwill ambassadors following the practice of honoring individuals with awards that denote goodwill ambassador status and roles. Awards are given for good relations, fundraising, acts of philanthropy and recognition for cause advocacy; some examples of such recognition are comedian Trevor Noah who received a South African Goodwill Ambassador Award in 2015, actress Alex Okoroji who received a Nigeria Goodwill Ambassador Award in 2017, and the Steve Irwin Memorial Goodwill Ambassador Award which was established in 2007. The former First Lady of Nigeria, Patience Jonathan, became a goodwill ambassador after receiving the African Goodwill Ambassador Award in Los Angeles in 2008.

=== Culture, customs and traditions ===
Since "goodwill" is an intangible asset it often needs a custodian in a culture that can conservatively emulate themselves in a social order to garner respect for the institutions of the state, nation or kingdom to advance civil society. This has given rise to organizations with specifically designated authorities like the Inter-African Committee on Traditional Practices (IAC) which uses current and former first ladies to preserve and protect traditional indigenous culture.

== State goodwill ambassadors ==
Many national states or provincial regions use goodwill ambassadors to promote tourism, economic development, traditional values, customs and cultural ideals that contribute to their recognition. US states have civil service recognition programs that designate goodwill ambassadors honorarily and officially who are responsible for promoting tourism, events and the prosperity of the state in general. The oldest example of this is the Kentucky Colonel, which is the highest award bestowed by the state's governor, officially established in 1895, the honorable title is given to civilians based on performing a great deed, community service or for accomplishing a noteworthy achievement that deserves recognition. The distinction of Kentucky colonel entitles the recipient to "discharge their duties" with the honorable title as a "colonel" and is denoted through the issuance of letters patent with the official dutiful designation as a good-will ambassador. Other US states also have similar civilian awards that denote the role of goodwill ambassador which are well-recognized, including that of the Tennessee Colonel, Rhode Island Commodore, Nebraska Admiral, Order of the Longleaf Pine, Arkansas Traveler, Yellow Rose of Texas, and Sagamore of the Wabash.

== Civilian goodwill ambassadors ==
There are many types of people that may be considered goodwill ambassadors representative to their local area for a short-time or over many years, informally, unofficially or by name. From a diplomatic perspective, the only difference in many cases is "who, under what authority, confirmed the appointment or commission to a post or mission based ambassadorship" with international protocol. Civilian goodwill ambassadors most often are not designated with an official appointment document from a head of state, granted letters patent, the honorable title or an officer commission; but this does not make them any less goodwill ambassadors. The term goodwill ambassador of an organization or ambassador of goodwill could be used for a company, an association, a local nonprofit, an event, a cause, an indigenous tribe, or a small city with a population of 50 to describe a representative; the difference and distinction of how and when to use the descriptive term as a professional title, position, role or occupation or to let it serve a part a job description is up to the person writing. Generally a goodwill ambassador can be anyone demonstrating benevolence on the part of someone else professionally, it can also be used in a community or informal sense.

There are many programs and objectives that include the term "goodwill ambassador" which are executed at a local levels for those who wish to pursue a career or define themselves using the term as a "goodwill ambassador". There are a number of cities that have exemplary permanent and established goodwill ambassador programs including New York City, Dallas, Los Angeles, and Miami-Dade, Florida.

== Other goodwill ambassador types ==
The term goodwill ambassador should be clearly distinguished from the relative concept of a brand ambassador, who plays a role in promoting a company, organization or product through personal interaction. Under the idea of brand ambassador other concepts converge such as a tourism ambassador, honorifically in name locally for an organization or for someone such as the spokesman for the local fire department that goes out to talk to school children, who serves as a goodwill ambassador in his/her own right as a fireman.

Universities often call campus ambassadors with different and varied roles, goodwill ambassadors.

There are many individuals and organizations that use the term competitively for recognition, despite not having been granted a commission, being licensed to use the mark Goodwill Ambassador as a title, or receiving the honorable title through an official appointment. Apparently many simply use the term because it appeals to them often causing confusion with other organizations that use legally designated goodwill ambassadors. Sometimes being recognized as a goodwill ambassador within an organization or on its own is perceived as an accomplishment in itself and not an actual role, or if a role, not a title. Organizations most likely are legally and morally responsible for the conduct of its title holders and use of the honorable title after their name as if they were employees or legal representatives.

=== LinkedIn ambassadors ===
Social media based network formations such as the LinkedIn goodwill ambassadors established in 2014 by Richard DiPilla led to confusion, when he recognized thousands upon thousands of professionals around the world as humanitarians with a digital computer award certificate conferring recognition as a "Global Goodwill Ambassador" based on the career and volunteer related information they have provided about themselves using their public LinkedIn profiles. The network, which claims over 17,000 goodwill ambassadors became an organization in subsequent years called the Global Goodwill Ambassadors Foundation (GGAF) based in Minnesota, DiPilla started a website and sought 501(c)(3) status. Because of the number of award recipients' assimilation of similar descriptive roles occupied by representatives associated with the United Nations, the organization's commemorative LinkedIn ambassadors have caused a great deal of ambiguity and confusion with official UNICEF Global Goodwill Ambassadors, an official UN Women Global Goodwill Ambassador, a Global Goodwill Ambassador for the World Food Program, the Global Goodwill Ambassador organization in New York, the Lamar University Global Goodwill Ambassadors Program and the Global Goodwill Ambassador Awards of 2016 in Nigeria. The organization's name, the number of awards that use the term, and number of people that received the award naturally diminish the efforts and messages of the original prior users of the term "Global Goodwill Ambassador" making them less effective when using the relevant words together to represent their identity in public relations campaigns, in the news, on the Internet, on Facebook, Twitter and on the world stage to carry out their official missions.

Unlike official designations granted by UN Women, UNICEF, UNHCR or other United Nations organizations which require an official designation, LinkedIn ambassadorships from the GGAF: do not require previous experience as an ambassador; are not developed to provide diplomatic credence; are not conferred by a head of state; do not represent a legal authority; do not obligate recipients to a legitimate commission; and do not regulate any official duty that can be recognized or understood by other states as a diplomatic post or an honorable title.

== See also ==
- Ambassador
- Facebook diplomacy
- Honorary consul
- Messengers of Peace (Scouts)
- Special Envoy of the Secretary-General
- United Nations Messengers of Peace
- Youth ambassador
