= UNIDO Goodwill Ambassador =

Official postnominal honorific title

UNIDO Goodwill Ambassador is an official postnominal honorific title, title of authority, legal status and job description assigned to those goodwill ambassadors and advocates who are designated by the United Nations. UNIDO goodwill ambassadors are expert advocates of the United Nations Industrial Development Organization (UNIDO) and use their abilities and experience to advocate for sustainable industrial development in developing countries. Other United Nations goodwill ambassador programs usually take a celebrity approach.

== Current UNIDO goodwill ambassadors ==
Current listed and supporting goodwill ambassadors, and the year they were appointed:

Time	Ambassador	Country	Profession
2019	Elisabetta Lattanzio Illy	Italy	photographer and journalist
2018	Marie-Louise Coleiro Preca	Malta	former President of the Republic of Malta
2018	Veronika Peshkova	Russia	executive Director of the Women’s Entrepreneurship Development Centre
2015	Janne Vangen Solheim	Norway	Chief Executive Officer of the Janusfabrikken AS
2014	Helen Hai	China	CEO of the Made in Africa Initiative
2014	Marc Van Montagu	Belgium	pioneer of plant molecular biology
2011	Marcos Pontes	Brazil	Brazil’s Minister of Science, Technology and Innovation
2005	Reinosuke Hara	Japan	representative of Hayama Capital Inc.
2005	Peter Sutherland	Ireland	industrialist and politician
2005	Mario Baccini	Italy	politician and President of the Italian Microcredit Institute
2004	Mamadou Mansour Cama	Senegal	businessman

== See also ==
- Goodwill Ambassador
- FAO Goodwill Ambassador
- UNDP Goodwill Ambassador
- UNHCR Goodwill Ambassador
- UNESCO Goodwill Ambassador
- UNODC Goodwill Ambassador
- UNFPA Goodwill Ambassador
- UN Women Goodwill Ambassador
- UNICEF Goodwill Ambassador
- WFP Goodwill Ambassador
- WHO Goodwill Ambassador
