= Guadalupe Valdez =

Dominican Republic politician (born 1957)

The Honourable Guadalupe Valdez
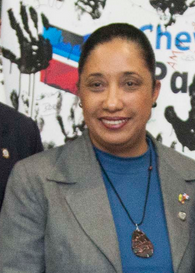
- Valdez in 2013

At-large National Deputy
- In office 16 August 2010 – 16 August 2016

Personal details
- Born: 22 September 1957 (age 68) Mexico City, Federal District, Mexico
- Party: Alliance for Democracy (since 1992)
- Spouse: Onofre Rojas
- Children: 2
- Parent(s): Nicolás Quírico Valdez, Lucía San Pedro
- Guadalupe Valdez on X

Guadalupe Valdez San Pedro (born 22 September 1957) is a Dominican Republic politician. She was national deputy from 2010 to 2016.

== Early life ==
Valdez was born in Mexico City to Nicolás Quírico Valdez, a Dominican labor activist exiled in Mexico, and Lucía San Pedro, a Mexican woman. Her father was considered a communist and was expelled from Mexico and had to seek asylum in the USSR. Valdez was raised in her maternal grandmother's home. After the fall of Rafael Trujillo’s dictatorship in 1961, Lucía San Pedro moved to Santo Domingo with her children, including Guadalupe, to rejoin her husband.

She was schooled at the República del Paraguay school and studied music at the Elila Mena School and at the National Conservatory. At 15 years old, she joined the Dominican Popular Socialist Party.

In 1984, she graduated with a bachelor in Economics from the Universidad Autónoma de Santo Domingo. She also earned her master's degree in higher education in 1987 and taught for a short time at the university. She was executive director of Center for Research and Social Promotion (CIPROS) from 1985 to 1995.

== Political career ==
In 1992, she co-founded the Alliance for Democracy party.

In 2010, Valdez was elected to the Chamber of Deputies of the Dominican Republic. She served as Deputy Minister of Education from 2008 to 2019. During her time, she supported the creation of Parliamentary Fronts Against Hunger (FPH) in Latin America and the Caribbean.

In 2016, Valdez was appointed as the "Zero Hunger" ambassador for Latin American and the Caribbean by the Food and Agriculture Organisation of the United Nations (FAO).

== Family and personal life ==
In 1982, she married Onofre Rojas, a fellow member of the Socialist Party.
