= WHO Goodwill Ambassador =

Celebrity advocate of the World Health Organization mission

WHO Goodwill Ambassador is an official honorary title that is granted to those goodwill ambassadors and advocates who are designated by the United Nations. WHO Goodwill Ambassadors are celebrity advocates of the World Health Organization (WHO), and they use their talent and fame to advocate for global health and well-being.

== Current ambassadors ==
As of March 2025, the current goodwill ambassadors (and the year of their appointment) include the following:

Name	Country	Year	Details
Gordon Brown	United Kingdom	2021	Former Prime Minister of the United Kingdom Goodwill Ambassador for Global Health Financing.
Peng Liyuan	China	2011	Vocal artist. Goodwill Ambassador for Tuberculosis and HIV/AIDS.
Yohei Sasakawa	Japan	2001	Chairman, Nippon Foundation. Goodwill Ambassador for Leprosy Elimination.

== Former ambassadors ==
The former goodwill ambassadors (and the year of their appointment) include the following:

Name	Country	Year(s)	Details
Amitabh Bachchan	India	2017	Goodwill Ambassador for Awareness of Hepatitis.
Christine Kaseba-Sata	Zambia	2012–2014	Doctor. Goodwill Ambassador Against Gender-based Violence.
Craig David	United Kingdom	2010	Singer. Goodwill Ambassador for the Stop TB Partnership.
Jet Li	China	2009–2014	International film star. Goodwill Ambassador.
Nancy Brinker	United States	2009	Founder, Susan G. Komen for the Cure. Goodwill Ambassador for Cancer Control.
Liya Kebede	Ethiopia	2005	Goodwill Ambassador.
Sylvie Vartan	Bulgaria	2005	Goodwill Ambassador.
Vienna Philharmonic Orchestra	Austria	2005	Goodwill Ambassador.

== Cancellation of status ==
On 21 October 2017, the WHO Director-General Tedros Adhanom Ghebreyesus appointed Zimbabwe's president Robert Mugabe as a WHO Goodwill Ambassador to help tackle non-communicable diseases in Africa. The appointment address praised Mugabe for his commitment to public health in Zimbabwe. The appointment attracted widespread condemnation in WHO member states and international organisations due to Mugabe's poor record on human rights and presiding over a decline in Zimbabwe's public health. Following widespread criticism, Tedros Adhanom was forced to withdraw the appointment (cancel the title) the next day.

== See also ==
- FAO Goodwill Ambassador
- UNDP Goodwill Ambassador
- UNHCR Goodwill Ambassador
- UNESCO Goodwill Ambassador
- UNODC Goodwill Ambassador
- UNFPA Goodwill Ambassador
- UN Women Goodwill Ambassador
- UNIDO Goodwill Ambassador
- UNICEF Goodwill Ambassador
- WFP Goodwill Ambassador
- United Nations Messengers of Peace
