= UNESCO Goodwill Ambassador =

Public figure that advocates for UNESCO

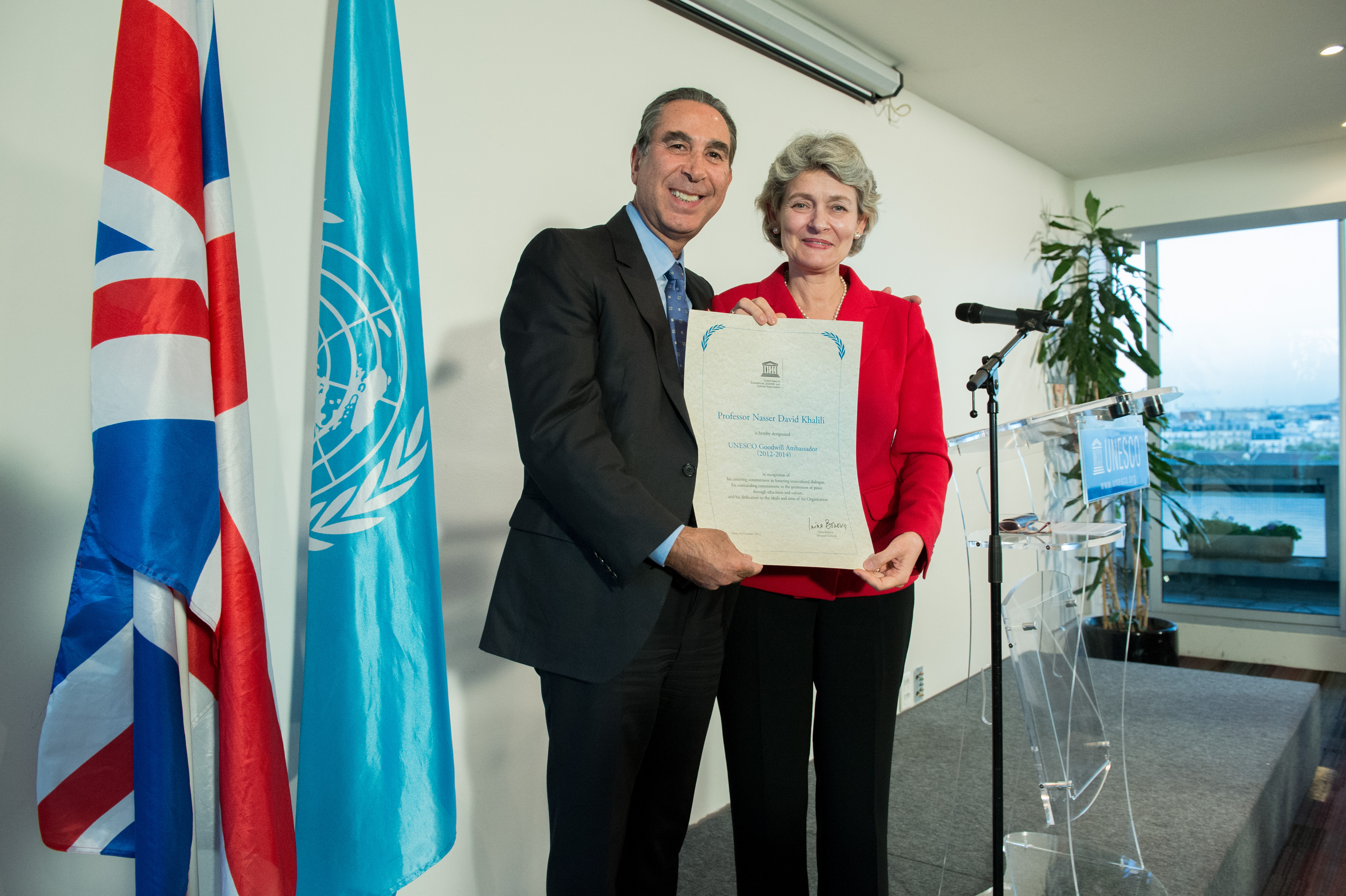
Director-General Irina Bokova with presenting the Goodwill Ambassador title certificate to the Honorable Nasser David Khalili to recognize his contributions and interests with UNESCO.

UNESCO Goodwill Ambassador is an official postnominal honorific title, title of authority, legal status and job description assigned to those goodwill ambassadors and advocates who are designated by the United Nations. UNESCO goodwill ambassadors are celebrity and expert advocates of UNESCO (not diplomatic ambassadors) who use their talent or fame to spread the UNESCO ideals, especially attracting media attention. Other specialized categories of advocates include UNESCO Artist for Peace, UNESCO Champion for Sport and UNESCO Special Envoy.

== Current UNESCO goodwill ambassadors ==
The following is a list of UNESCO goodwill ambassadors along with the projects and activities they support:

Name	Country	Date	Projects and Activities Supported	Link
Xueli Abbing	Netherlands	2022	Fight against discriminations and racism	
Valdas Adamkus	Lithuania	2003	Construction of Knowledge Societies	
Seidnaly Sidahmed Alphadi	Niger	2016	for African innovation and creation	
Christiane Amanpour	United Kingdom	2015	Freedom of expression and journalist safety	
Yalitza Aparicio	Mexico	2019	Indigenous Peoples	
Metin Arditi	Switzerland	2014	UNESCO Honorary Ambassador and Special Envoy for Intercultural Dialogue	
Chantal Biya	Cameroon	2008	Education and Social Inclusion	
Claude-Alix Bertrand	Haiti	2014	Culture, Education, Cultural Diplomacy, Children's Rights, Sport and Tourism	
Sergey Bubka	Ukraine	2003	for Sport	
Laura Welch Bush	United States	2003	UNESCO Honorary Ambassador for the Decade of Literacy in the context of the United Nations Literacy Decade (2003–2012)	
Claudia Cardinale	Italy	2000	Promotion of women's rights, especially for women in the Mediterranean; Environment issues	
Princess Caroline of Hanover	Monaco	2003	Protection of children and the family, empowerment of women and girls in Africa	
Mauro Colagreco	Argentina	2022	Biodiversity	
Princess Dana Firas	Jordan	2017	Heritage protection and preservation	_
Rossy de Palma	Spain	2022	Cultural Diversity	
Tan Dun	China	2013		
Viatcheslav Fetissov	Russia	2004	for Sport	
Vigdís Finnbogadóttir	Iceland	1998	Promotion of linguistic diversity, women's rights, education	
Princess Firyal of Jordan	Jordan	1992	Promotion of the Education for All initiative, humanitarian actions, World Heritage, women's rights, especially Arab women	
Sen Genshitsu	Japan	2012		
Nizan Guanaes	Brazil	2011		
Herbie Hancock	United States	2011		
Bahia Hariri	Lebanon	2000	Preservation of World Heritage, education, culture, women's rights and sustainable development in the Arab world	
Vitaly Ignatenko	Russia	2008	Building of the capacities of the Russian language journalists and promotion of the free circulation of ideas in the Russian-speaking world	
Jean Michel Jarre	France	1993	Protection of the environment (water, fight against desertification, renewable energies), youth and tolerance, safeguarding of World Heritage	
Beate Klarsfeld and Serge Klarsfeld	France	2015	UNESCO Honorary Ambassadors and Special Envoys for Education about the History of Holocaust and Genocide Prevention	
Naomi Kawase	Japan	2021	for Cultural and Creative Industries	
Nasser David Khalili	United Kingdom	2012	Promotion of intercultural dialogue and promotion of peace through education and culture.	
Deeyah Khan	Norway	2016	Artistic freedom and creativity	
Marc Ladreit de Lacharrière	France	2009	Education about History of Holocaust and genocide prevention.	
Princess Lalla Meryem of Morocco	Morocco	2001	Protection of childhood and women's rights	
Princess Laurentien of the Kingdom of the Netherlands	Netherlands	2009	UNESCO Special Envoy on Literacy for Development	
Peng Liyuan	China	2014	UNESCO Special Envoy for the Advancement of Girl's and Women’s Education	
Princess Maha Chakri Sirindhorn of Thailand	Thailand	2005	Empowerment of Minority Children and the Preservation of their Intangible Cultural Heritage	
Jean Malaurie	France	2007	In charge of arctic polar issues, promoting environmental issues and safeguarding the culture and knowledge of the peoples of the Arctic	
Grand Duchess María Teresa of Luxembourg	Luxembourg	1997	Education, Women's rights, microfinance and campaign against poverty	
Denis Matsuev	Russia	2014	Promotion of musical education and his efforts to support young talent through the New Names Foundation.	
Maria Francesca Merloni	Italy	2017		
Oskar Metsavaht	Brazil	2011		
Vera Michalski-Hoffmann	Switzerland	2016		
Hayat Sindi	Saudi Arabia	2012	Promotion of science education for Arab women	
Vik Muniz	Brazil	2011		
Kitín Muñoz	Spain	1997	Protection and promotion of indigenous cultures and their environment	
Alexandra Ochirova	Russia	2012		
Ute-Henriette Ohoven	Germany	1992	UNESCO Special Ambassador for Education of Children in Need	
Kim Phuc Phan Thi	Vietnam	1994	Protection and education for children, orphans and innocent victims of war	
Judith Pisar	United States	2017	UNESCO Special Envoy for Cultural Diplomacy	
Susana Rinaldi	Argentina	1992	Street children, Culture of Peace	
Hedva Ser	France	2011	Cultural diplomacy	
Mintimer Shaïmiev	Russia	2017	UNESCO Special Envoy for Intercultural Dialogue	
SA Sheikha Moza Bint Nasser	Qatar	2003	Special Envoy for Basic and Higher Education	
Jaqueline Silva	Brazil	2009		
Hayat Sindi	Saudi Arabia	2012	Promotion de l'enseignement scientifique pour les femmes arabes	
Princess Sumaya bint El Hassan	Jordan	2017	Pour la science au service de la paix	
Salif Traoré	Ivory Coast	2012		
Zurab Tsereteli	Georgia	1996	Cultural and artistic projects	
Marianna Vardinoyannis	Greece	1999	Protection of childhood; promotion of cultural Olympics; humanitarian relief for war victims	
Sunny Varkey	India	2012	Promoter of education. Currently in United Arab Emirates.	
Milú Villela	Brazil	2004	Voluntary Action and Basic Education in Latin America	
Forest Whitaker	United States	2011	UNESCO Special Envoy for Peace and Reconciliation	

== Former Ambassadors ==
Name	Country	Tenure as Ambassador	Link
Ivonne A-Baki	Ecuador	2010-2020	
Ara Abramian	Russia	2003 - 2022	
Mehriban Aliyeva	Azerbaijan	2004 - 2022	Promotion and safeguarding of intangible cultural heritage, especially oral traditions and expressions
José Antonio Abreu	Venezuela	1998 - 2018	
Paul Ahyi	Ivory Coast	2009 - 2010	
Virgilijus Alekna	Lithuania	2007 - 2020	
Alicia Alonso	Cuba	2002 - 2019	
Patrick Baudry	France	1999 - 2020	
Pierre Bergé	France	1992 - 2017	
Montserrat Caballé	Spain	1994 - 2018	
Pierre Cardin	France	1991 - 2020	
Maha al-Khalil Chalabi	Lebanon	2016 - 2022	Heritage protection and preservation in Tyre
Marin Constantin	Romania	1992–2011	
Esther Coopersmith	United States	2009–2024	
Cheick Modibo Diarra	Mali	1998 - 2020	
Miguel Angel Estrella	Argentina	1989 - 2022	Promotion of Culture of Peace and tolerance through music
Juan Diego Florez	Peru	2012 - 2020	
Sheikh Ghassan I. Shaker	Oman	1989–2011	
Ivry Gitlis	Israel	1998 - 2020	
Christine Hakim	Indonesia	2008 - 2020	
Ikuo Hirayama	Japan	1989–2009	
S. Exc. M. Mwai Kibaki	Kenya	2005 - 2022	For Water in Africa
Lily Marinho	Brazil	1999–2011	
Rabah Madjer	Algeria	2011 - 2020	
Nelson Mandela	South Africa	2005 - 2013	
Rigoberta Menchú Tum	Guatemala	1996 - 2020	
Yehudi Menuhin	Switzerland; United Kingdom	1992–1999	
Cristina Owen-Jones	Italy	2004 - 2020	
Renzo Piano	Italy	........ - 2014	
Samuel Pisar	United States	........ - 2015	
Ivo Pogorelić	Croatia; Serbia	1988–2009	
Mstislav Rostropovich	Russia	1998–2007	
Yazid Sabeg	France	2010 - 2020	
Serik Sapiyev	Kazakhstan	2013 - 2020	
Giancarlo Elia Valori	Italy	2001 - 2022	Safeguarding of Intangible Heritage

== See also ==
- Goodwill Ambassador
- FAO Goodwill Ambassador
- UNDP Goodwill Ambassador
- UNHCR Goodwill Ambassador
- UNODC Goodwill Ambassador
- UNFPA Goodwill Ambassador
- UN Women Goodwill Ambassador
- UNIDO Goodwill Ambassador
- UNICEF Goodwill Ambassador
- WFP Goodwill Ambassador
- WHO Goodwill Ambassador
