= UNICEF Goodwill Ambassador =

Public figures selected to promote UNICEF programs

UNICEF Goodwill Ambassador is an official postnominal honorific title, title of authority, legal status, and job description assigned to those goodwill ambassadors and advocates who are designated by the United Nations. The United Nations International Children's Emergency Fund (UNICEF) along with other United Nations agencies, has long enlisted the voluntary services and support of prominent individuals as goodwill ambassadors to advocate causes. Their fame helps amplify the urgent and universal message of human development and international cooperation, helping to accelerate programmes for children and youth. UNICEF is responsible for a wide-variety of educational and health projects. UNICEF is greatly responsible for the eradication of polio campaign. There are over 250 UNICEF goodwill ambassadors.

== History ==
Danny Kaye was the first to hold the goodwill ambassador position, with the title of Ambassador-at-Large granted in 1954. Other celebrities have followed, acting as international, regional or national goodwill ambassadors, depending on their profile, interests, and desired level of responsibility. The goal of the program is to allow celebrities with a demonstrated interest in UNICEF issues to use their fame to draw attention to important issues. This may take the form of public appearances and talks, visits to troubled regions, which draw attention from the media, and use of their political access to advocate UNICEF causes.

== Public figures ==
As one of the necessary programs of the United Nations, the use of local and regional celebrities is a key element of the UNICEF goodwill ambassador programme. UNICEF does not pay for local advertising, but their work through the use of public figures naturally attract the news media.

Ambassadors' fame can bring benefits to UNICEF. Celebrities attract attention to the needs of children, for example when visiting field projects and emergency programmes, and can boost the public profile of fundraising campaigns. Through their networks and access to senior stakeholders in positions of authority, they can make direct representations for UNICEF, supporting its mission to ensure every child's right to health, education, equality and protection.

== See also ==
- List of UNICEF Goodwill Ambassadors
- Goodwill Ambassador
- UNESCO Goodwill Ambassador
- WHO Goodwill Ambassador
