= Legal status =

Status held by an entity as determined by the law

Legal status describes the legal rights, duties and obligations of a person or entity, or a subset of those rights and obligations. The term may be used to describe a person's legal condition with respect to personal rights, but excluding proprietary relations, such as their having the status of a spouse. It may also refer to legal capacity apart from other elements of personal status, such as the status of a minor, or the set of privileges, obligations, powers or restrictions that a person or entity receives through legislation.

The term may also refer to a person's legal condition as imposed by law but without consent, such as the status of an indentured servant when indentured servitude is enforced by law.

Legal status may be something that arises solely by operation of law, such as being a Social Security recipient, describing the individual's relationship to the law.
