= Zoe Whittall =

Canadian poet, novelist and TV writer (born 1976)

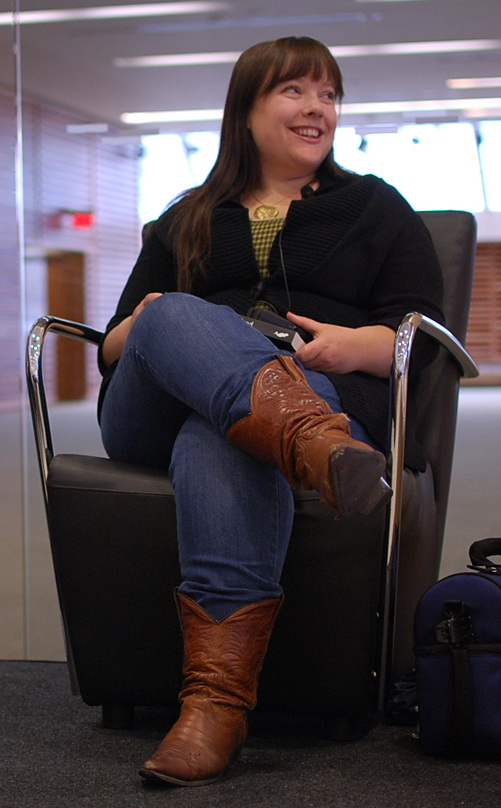
- Born: February 16, 1976 (age 50); Eastern Townships of Quebec, Canada
- Occupation: Writer
- Writing career
- Period: 2000s–present
- Notable works: The Best Kind of People; Bottle Rocket Hearts; Holding Still for as Long as Possible
- Notable awards: 2008 Dayne Ogilvie Prize; 2011 Lambda Literary Award for Trans Fiction; 2016 K.M. Hunter Award

Zoe Whittall (born February 16, 1976) is a Canadian poet, novelist and TV writer. She has published five novels and three poetry collections to date.

== Early life and education ==
Whittall was born in 1976 in the Eastern Townships of Quebec and spent her childhood on a farm on the outskirts of South Durham. She graduated from Dawson College in Montreal in 1995, attended Concordia University from 1995 to 1997, and completed a Master of Fine Arts in Creative Writing from the University of Guelph in 2009.

== Career ==
She works as a TV writer and previously worked as an arts reporter and in small press publishing.

Her first novel, Bottle Rocket Hearts, was named a Globe and Mail Best Book of the Year and one of the top ten essential Canadian novels of the decade by CBC's Canada Reads.

She won the Writers' Trust of Canada's Dayne Ogilvie Grant for best gay emerging writer in 2008. She subsequently served on the award's 2011 jury, selecting Farzana Doctor as that year's winner.

Holding Still for as Long as Possible, Whittall's second novel, was published in 2009 in Canada and 2010 in the United States. It has been optioned for film, and was shortlisted for the 2010 ReLit Award. It was an honour book for the American Library Association's Stonewall Book Award in 2011, as well as winning a Lambda Literary Award for Transgender Fiction and becoming a finalist for their Lesbian Fiction award.

In 2010 she published a short novella for Orca Books' Rapid Reads series called The Middle Ground, a book for adults with low literacy skills.

Her poetry books include The Best Ten Minutes of Your Life, The Emily Valentine Poems and Precordial Thump. She edited the short fiction anthology Geeks, Misfits & Outlaws (McGilligan Books) in 2003.

In 2013 Whittall created the poem 'Unequal to me', a collection of book reviews illustrating gender bias, revealing sexism and misogyny, by swapping the authors' personal pronouns indicated by the critics.

In 2016, her novel The Best Kind of People was published in Canada by House of Anansi and shortlisted for the Scotiabank Giller Prize. In 2017, it was published in hardcover in the U.K. by Hodder & Stoughton, and in the United States by Ballantine Books, an imprint of Penguin Random House. The novel is currently being adapted for feature film by director Sarah Polley. The Best Kind of People was named Indigo's #1 Book of 2016, and a best book of the year by Walrus Magazine, The Globe & Mail, Toronto Life, and The National Post. The year also saw Whittall awarded the K.M. Hunter Artist Award for literature, given to people who have demonstrated both talent and the potential for further development in their field.

In 2018, Whittall won a Canadian Screen Award for Best Writing in a Variety or Sketch Comedy Series for Baroness von Sketch Show, alongside Aurora Browne, Meredith MacNeill, Carolyn Taylor, Jennifer Whalen, Jennifer Goodhue, Monica Heisey and Mae Martin.

She collaborated with Noel S. Baker and Pat Mills on the screenplay for the 2024 film We Forgot to Break Up, which was directed by Karen Knox.

In 2024, she also published the autofiction and prose poetry work No Credit River, which she labeled "an unreliable memoir". It focuses on heartbreak, love, anxiety, and writing. It was a finalist for the 2025 Lambda Literary Award for LGBTQ+ Poetry. Sanna Wani gave it a starred review in Quill & Quire, praising it as "spare and cinematic; the texture loose, memorable, and scattered with lines as poetic as they are biting." Bella Moses, reviewing for Foreword, concluded that the book "covers the aftermath of a life-altering breakup, addressing themes of queer relationality and sexuality, aging, pregnancy, and loss with intelligence, wit, and devastating candor."

== Personal life ==
She lives in Toronto.

== Bibliography ==
=== Novels ===
- Bottle Rocket Hearts, 2007 (Cormorant Books)
- Holding Still For as Long as Possible, 2009 (House of Anansi)
- The Middle Ground, 2010 (Orca Book Publishers)
- The Best Kind of People, 2016 (House of Anansi)
- The Spectacular, 2021 (HarperCollins Canada) ISBN 9781529383089
- The Fake, 2023, (HarperCollins Canada) ISBN 9781443455282 (paperback), ISBN 9781443455275 (hardcover)
- No Credit River (Book*hug Press) ISBN 9781771669078

=== Poetry ===
- The Best Ten Minutes of Your Life, 2001 (McG)
- The Emily Valentine Poems, 2006 (Snare)
- Precordial Thump, 2008 (Exile Editions)
