= Judy Gold =

American comedian (born 1962)

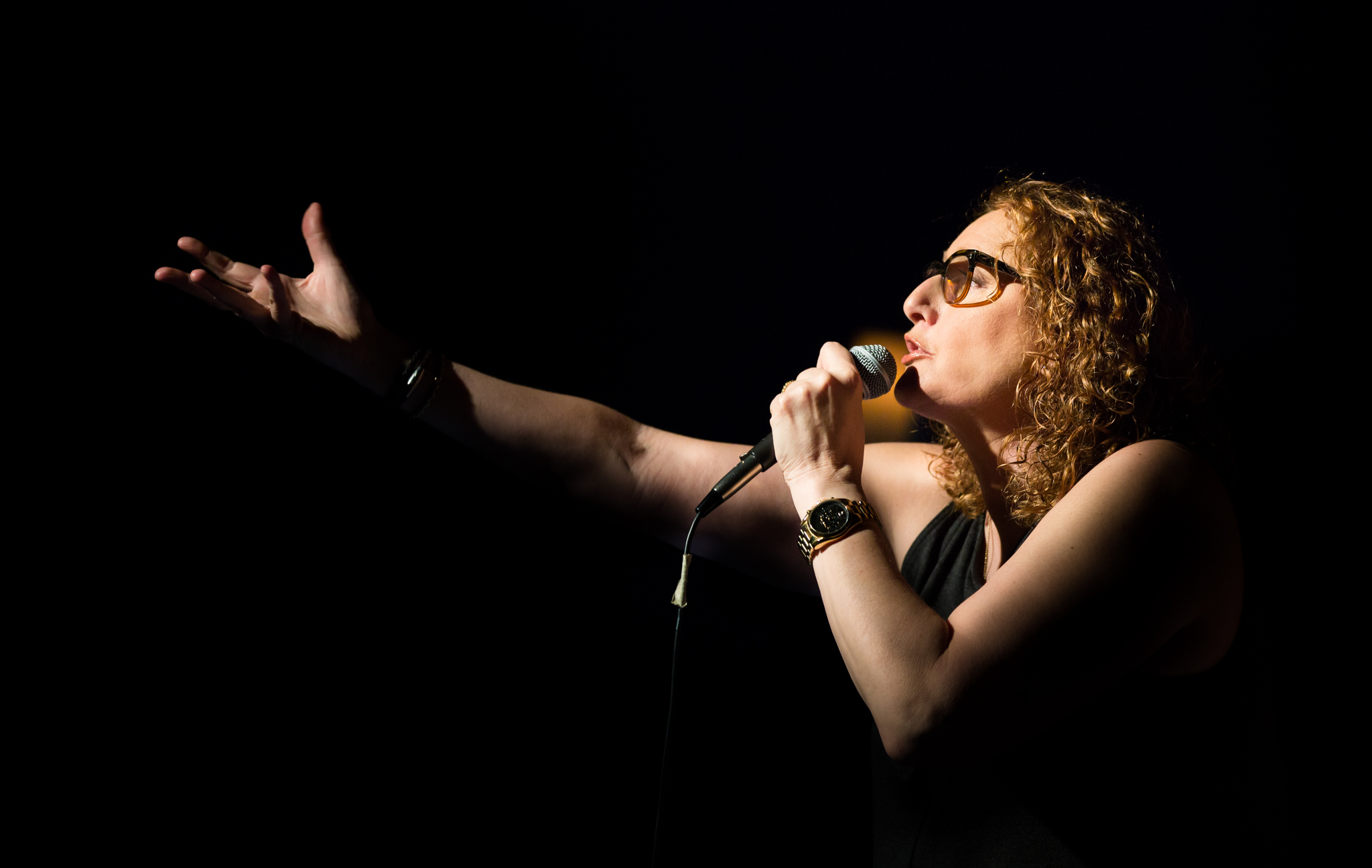
- Born: November 15, 1962 (age 64); Clark, New Jersey, U.S.
- Occupations: Stand-up comedian, actor, television writer, producer, author, podcaster, activist
- Years active: 1986–present
- Height: 6 ft 2 in (1.88 m)
- Partner: Elysa Halpern
- Children: 2
- Website: judygold.com

Judy Gold (born November 15, 1962) is an American stand-up comedian, actor, podcaster, television writer, author, producer, and activist. She won two Daytime Emmy Awards for her work as a writer and producer on The Rosie O'Donnell Show. From 2015-2025, Gold hosted the podcast It's Judy's Show with Judy Gold. Her collection of essays, "Yes I Can Say That: When They Come for the Comedians, We Are All in Trouble," was published in 2020. In 2023, she turned her book into a solo show, "Yes, I Can Say That!" directed by BD Wong.

== Early life ==
Gold was born on November 15, 1962, in Clark, New Jersey. Gold grew up in a Jewish home with her two siblings. She plays piano. Gold moved to Manhattan, New York from New Jersey in 1984 after she graduated from Rutgers University.

== Stand-Up ==
Gold started stand-up when she was nineteen years old; she did her first set at Rutgers in 1981. She was passed at Catch a Rising Star in 1985, and has been a regular at the Comedy Cellar since the 1980s.

In an interview with Marc Maron, Gold revealed her comedic influences were Joan Rivers, Phyllis Diller, and Totie Fields. Gold's stand-up specials have aired on Comedy Central, LOGO, and HBO. She has been featured in Netflix's Stand Out: An LGBTQ+ Celebration, and in the companion documentary about LGBTQ+ comedians OUTSTANDING: A Comedy Revolution, which premiered at the Tribeca Film Festival.

Gold has released three comedy albums: 2004's Judith’s Roommate Had a Baby, 2018's Kill Me Now, and 2020's Conduct Unbecoming.

== Television and film ==
Her first television role was on Roseanne in 1991, followed by a series regular role on Margaret Cho's 1994 sitcom All-American Girl. Gold was cast as Gloria Schechter, one of Cho's characters friends. Gold's acting credits include: Tripped Up, She Came To Me, Love Reconsidered, and Wings. Her recent TV credits include Showtime's City On A Hill and The First Lady, FX’s Better Things, and Apple TV+ Extrapolations. Other guest appearances include Girls5Eva, Broad City, Hulu's Life and Beth, and recurring roles on Awkwafina, TBS’ Search Party, and Netflix's Friends from College.

She was a focus of Trevor Noah’s documentary XCLD: The Story of Cancel Culture. In 2007, she was featured in the film Making Trouble, a tribute to female Jewish comedians, produced by the Jewish Women's Archive.

She was also a writer on the final season of FX's Better Things.

Gold is a subject of the Hulu documentary Hysterical. She has made appearances on The Tonight Show and The Late Show with Stephen Colbert Gold has been a guest on The View, The Today Show, The Drew Barrymore Show, and a free-speech advocate on MSNBC, CNN and NewsNation She has appeared on the Food Network, including competing on Chopped All-Stars and Rachel vs. Guy: Celebrity Cook-Off.

From 1999 to 2010, Gold hosted HBO's At the Multiplex with Judy Gold. She appeared as a commentator on 2007 truTV's World's Dumbest....

She's featured on Mindy Kaling's new Hulu show "Not Suitable for Work", as well as in Larry David's new HBO show, "Life, Larry and the Pursuit of Unhappiness." Judy will play Sheryl Vanzandt on The Varnell Hill Show, a spin-off of the 90's sitcom Martin (TV series), premiering September 1, 2026 on Paramount+.

== Stage shows ==
Gold has written and starred in the Off-Broadway shows: Yes I Can Say That!, The Judy Show – My Life as a Sitcom, and 25 Questions for a Jewish Mother. She was a featured player as Gremio in The Public Theater's Shakespeare in the Park all-female production of The Taming of The Shrew. She also co-starred in Off-Broadway's Clinton! The Musical, and Disaster! The Musical.

Gold's one-woman show 25 Questions for a Jewish Mother, co-written with Kate Moira Ryan, is based on a series of interviews with more than 50 Jewish mothers in the United States. Their stories are interspersed with anecdotes about her own mother and her life as a lesbian mother of two sons. It ran at the Ars Nova Theater in New York City in early 2006 and reopened later that year at St. Luke's Theater.

On June 30, 2011, The Judy Gold Show: My Life as a Sitcom, began previews at Off-Broadway's DR2 Theatre in New York City. This one-woman show was an homage to the classic sitcoms of Gold's youth. The show is written by Gold and Kate Moira Ryan and directed by Amanda Charlton. The show officially opened on July 6, 2011. The New York Times called the show "highly entertaining." The New York Post called the show "gleefully self-deprecating". The show subsequently opened in Los Angeles June 18, 2013, and had a one-month run at the Geffen Playhouse.

In 2011, Gold was named a Givenik Ambassador. In 2015, she appeared off-Broadway as Eleanor Roosevelt in the satiric musical Clinton: The Musical at New World Stages.

Her one-woman show, based on her book, Yes I Can Say That! premiered in March 2023 and was directed by BD Wong at 59E59 Theaters.

== Writing ==
Gold is the author of Yes I Can Say That: When They Come For The Comedians, We Are All In Trouble, a book about free speech and cancel-culture. It was released in 2020.

In 2021, Gold wrote an opinion essay for CNN, 'I Still Can't Stop Watching Cecily Strong's Clown.'

== Personal life ==
Gold is a lesbian. She was in a relationship with Sharon Callahan for nearly 20 years. Together they have two children, Henry and Ben, whom she frequently referenced on the show Tough Crowd with Colin Quinn. She met her current partner, Elysa Halpern, on a blind date set up by Time Out New York in 2007. Gold is very active in both the LGBT and Jewish communities. She was active in support of the 2004 and 2008 Democratic presidential campaigns. Gold served on the Board of Directors of the National Coalition Against Censorship.

== Filmography ==
=== Film ===
Year	Title	Role	Notes
2001	The Curse of the Jade Scorpion	Voltan's Participant	
2004	Our Italian Husband	Nun #2	
2005	The Aristocrats	Herself	Documentary
2017	Gilbert	Herself	Documentary
2021	Hysterical	Herself	Documentary
2023	She Came to Me	Susan Shaw	
2023	Tripped Up	Chef Missy	
2024	Love... Reconsidered	Susie	

=== Television ===
Year	Title	Role	Notes
1991	Roseanne	Amy	1 episode
1993	Rumor Has It	Panelist	1 episode
1994–1995	All American Girl	Gloria Schechter	18 episodes
1995	HBO Comedy Half-Hour: Judy Gold	Herself	
1995	Here Come the Munsters	Elsa Munster Hyde	TV movie
1995	The City	Judy Silver	1 episode
1996	Wings	Brenda	1 episode
1997	Lois Lives a Little		Short
1998	Arli$$		1 episode
2000	The Drew Carey Show	Leslie	2 episodes
2000	Law & Order	Deborah Patterson	1 episode
2000	Sidesplitters: The Burt & Dick Story	Dick's Mother	Short
2001	The Ballad of Lucy Whipple	Buck McPhee	TV film
2002	Sex and the City	Barnes & Noble Clerk	1 episode
2002	Law & Order: Special Victims Unit	Forensic Gynecologist	1 episode
2003	Comic Remix	Herself	1 episode
2003	The Gynecologists	Mrs. LeBlanc	Short
2004	Ed	Judge Fisher	1 episode
2005	Here! Family		1 episode
2007–2008	Super Normal	The Roving Eye / Madam Midterm / Granny	15 episodes
2008–2013	World's Dumbest	Herself	114 episodes
2009	Ugly Betty	Joan	1 episode
2011	The Glades	Rebecca Thornquist	1 episode
2012	30 Rock	Judy Gold	1 episode
2012	Are We There Yet?	Sylvia Treadway	1 episode
2013	The Big C	Rabbi	1 episode
2013	2 Broke Girls	Jerri	1 episode
2014	Melissa and Joey	Janey	2 episodes
2014	Teachers Lounge	Gym Teacher	1 episode
2015	Louie	Marina	1 episode
2015	The Jim Gaffigan Show	Judy Gold	1 episode
2016	Broad City	Angela	1 episode
2016	Unbreakable Kimmy Schmidt	Judy	1 episode
2016	Crisis in Six Scenes	Phonebooth Woman	1 episode
2016	Difficult People	Judy Gold	1 episode
2016	Search Party	Paulette Capuzzi	2 episodes
2016	What's Your F#@king Deal?!	Herself	Post-Production
2017	I'm Dying Up Here	Judy Elder	1 episode
2017	Nightcap	Deb Hafner	5 episodes
2018	Murphy Brown	ICE Agent Lynch	1 episode
2020	Helpsters	Crossing Guard Carla	1 episode
2020–2022	Better Things	Chaya	5 episodes
2021; 2023	Awkwafina Is Nora from Queens	The Librarian	2 episodes
2022	City on a Hill	Cassandra Kassell	3 episodes
2022	Extrapolations	Sophie	1 episode
2022	The First Lady	Elizabeth Read	4 episodes
2022	Girls5eva	Dr. Madden	1 episode
2022	Life & Beth		1 episode
2025	Hell's Kitchen	Herself	Episode: "Five Comedians Walk into Hell..."
2026	Life, Larry and the Pursuit of Unhappiness	Evelyn	Episode: "Deepthroat"
2026	The Varnell Hill Show	Sheryl	

=== Web ===
Year	Title	Role	Notes
2013	Real Actors Read Yelp	Herself	1 episode, streaming on YouTube
2015	Ambience	Estelle	1 episode, streaming online
2023	Around the Sun (audio drama)	Paula	3 episodes
