= I'm a TV =

Studio album by Mae Martin
- Released: February 27, 2025
- Studio: 64Sound; The Dome
- Genre: Indie rock
- Length: 31:26
- Label: Universal Canada
- Producer: Jason Couse; Wes Marskell

I'm a TV is the debut studio album by Canadian comedian Mae Martin. It was released by Universal Music Canada on February 27, 2025, and is described as indie rock with all songs written by Martin and produced by Wes Marskell and Jason Couse of the Darcys.

== Background ==
In a 2025 interview Martin said of their debut album, "My great fear is that it'll feel like I'm trying to be a rock star. But it felt like it sounded like me and like an extension of my other work, and so maybe people would be more receptive to it."

The sound of I'm a TV was influenced by 1990s pop and emo rock with Martin performing piano, guitar, harmonica and bass on the album.

The album's debut single was titled "Good Dream" and the single's artwork shows Martin from the back, lying on the floor watching TV in denim shorts, gold chain and socks.

== Track listing ==
All tracks are written by Mae Martin.

I'm a TV track listing
No.	Title	Length
1.	"Try Me"	2:50
2.	"Good Dream"	3:03
3.	"Big Bear"	2:40
4.	"Stowaway"	3:03
5.	"I Love You So Much"	3:25
6.	"No Cowboy"	2:39
7.	"Garbage Strike"	3:03
8.	"Brought Me Round"	4:32
9.	"Quiet Street"	3:27
10.	"People Get Back Up"	2:39
Total length:		31:26

I'm a TV (Welcome Distraction Edition) track listing
No.	Title	Length
11.	"Everyone You Know Will Let You Down"	3:34
12.	"Recent Hit"	2:53
13.	"Good Dream" (acoustic)	3:01
14.	"Stowaway" (acoustic)	2:51
Total length:		43:43

== Critical reception ==
The New York Times wrote, "Their album I'm a TV is also a departure — no punchlines, no bits, just dreamy indie rock that explores longings, identity and friendships on the verge of something else."

The Los Angeles Times said, "The LP is pithy in the way that Phoebe Bridgers or Jenny Lewis write one-liners, but it's an unexpectedly tender songwriter record from one of the sharpest, most self-aware minds in stand-up."

== Personnel ==
Credits adapted from the album's liner notes and Tidal.

- Mae Martin – vocals (all tracks), guitar (tracks 1–12), background vocals (3–10), bass (7), keyboards (8), harmonica (9, 10), acoustic guitar (13, 14)
- Jason Couse – production, recording, engineering, mixing (all tracks); programming (1–10), guitar (1–6, 9–12), bass (1–4, 11–13), keyboards (2, 3, 6–14), background vocals (6, 8, 11–14), strings (14)
- Wes Marskell – production (all tracks), drums (1–3, 5, 6, 8, 11, 12), bass (1, 5, 6)
- Charles Watson – production (1, 3, 6), guitar (1, 3–5), keyboards (1, 3, 4), background vocals (4, 6, 8), bass (8)
- David Davis – recording (1, 3–6, 8), background vocals (6, 8)
- Tyler Karmen – recording (1, 3–6, 8)
- Taylor Kernohan – recording (1, 3–5, 8, 11, 12)
- Elisa Pangsaeng – mastering
- Carmen Elle – guitar (4, 6), background vocals (6, 8)
- Stephen Krecklo – guitar (6)
- JJ Geiger – photography
- Andy Slater – creative direction
- James Livitski – design
