= Markarov =

Markarov is a surname, with its female form being Markarova. Notable people with the surname include:

- Aleksandr Markarov (born 1950), Russian professional football coach
- Boris Markarov (born 1935), Russian water polo player
- Eduard Markarov (born 1942), Soviet footballer
- Nikolay Markarov (1933–2008), Soviet Russian artist and sculptor
- Oksana Markarova (born 1976), Ukrainian politician and diplomat
- Sergueï Markarov (born 1950), Soviet pianist and UNESCO Artist for Peace
