= Writer's block (disambiguation) =

Writer's block is a phenomenon involving the temporary (psychological) loss of ability to write.

Writer's block may also refer to:

- The Writer's Block, an independent bookseller and literacy educator in Las Vegas, Nevada
- The Writers' Block, a Canadian comedy web series
- Writer's Block (Evergreen Terrace album), 2004
- Writer's Block (Peter Bjorn and John album), 2006
- "Writer's Block" (Just Jack song), 2006
- "Writer's Block" (Royce da 5'9" song), 2011
- "Writer's Block – Interlude", an unreleased song by SZA
