= Washing machine (disambiguation) =

A washing machine is an appliance used to wash laundry.

Washing machine may also refer to:

- Washing Machine (album), a 1995 album by Sonic Youth
- "Washing Machine", a 1986 track by Larry Heard under the name Mr. Fingers
- "Washing Machine", a song by Kings of Convenience from the 2021 album Peace or Love
- The Washing Machine, a 1993 Italian film originally released as Vortice Mortale
