= Philippe Caroit =

French actor (born 1959)

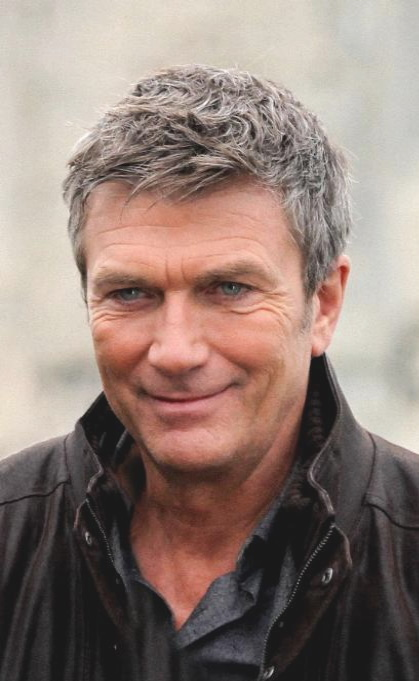
- Born: September 29, 1959 (age 67); Paris, France
- Occupations: Actor, painter, writer
- Years active: 1981–present
- Website: www.philippecaroit.com/

Philippe Caroit (born September 29, 1959) is a French actor, painter, and writer.

== Early life ==
Caroit was born in Paris, as the fourth of seven children. In his teenage years, he began to develop a passion for travelling, to discover new places and meet people, which made him also learn several foreign languages.

After finishing school, he started to study medicine, following the footsteps of his father. In the third year of studies, he joined the Conservatoire in Montpellier, where he discovered his passion for theatre. Back in Paris, he continued to study medicine and theatre in parallel. In the sixth year of medicine, while working in a hospital in the 14th arrondissement in Paris, he decided to give up the study and dedicate completely to become an actor, joining the Théâtre de Soleil of Ariane Mnouchkine.

== Career ==
His first cinema role was in the movie “La Femme de l’aviateur” (“The Aviator's Wife”) directed by Eric Rohmer in 1981. The next year he had his television debut in “Les ombres” by Jean Claude Brisseau. These were followed by more than 100 roles in French and foreign movies for cinema and television across the world, as Caroit speaks also English, German, Italian and Spanish. In 1999 he directed his first short movie “Faire-part” starring Christine Murillo, Antoine Dulery and Caroline Tresca.

Beyond his roles for cinema and television, he continued to play also in theatre. Among his roles there were Jesus in “Un homme nomme Jesus” (“A Man Named Jesus” in Palais des Sports in Paris; the play entered the Guinness Book for breaking all attendance records) and Seznec in “Seznec”, both with Robert Hossein or Marc in “La Societe des Loisirs”, play written by François Archambault, which he adapted.

Caroit authored and adapted scripts for theatre (“La Societe de Loisirs” and “Tu Te Souviendras de Moi”), television (“Le Mystere des Carpates” for the TV series Cancoon) and cinema (“Faire-part”).

“The Curse of the Snail” (fr: "La malediction de l’escargot"), his first novel, was published by Anne Carrière in November 2020. The pocket edition of the book is available since June 2023 (published by Bonneton).

In 2025, he takes on a triple role – writer, director, and actor – in Paillettes, a dark comedy, alongside Denis Maréchal, Shirley Bousquet, and Stéphanie Pasterkamp.

== Personal life ==
Caroit has a daughter, Blanche, from his marriage to Caroline Tresca. Since December 2022, he is also the father of a boy named Lucien.

In his spare time, Caroit likes to paint, his works being influenced by the German Expressionism, the Fauvism and Les Nabis.

== Filmography ==
=== Cinema ===
Philippe Caroit film credits
Year	Title	Role	Notes
1981	The Aviator's Wife	François' Friend	Éric Rohmer (dir)
1982	Enigma	Student	Jeannot Szwarc (dir)
1983	Liberty belle	Gilles	Pascal Kané (dir)
1984	How Did You Get In? We Didn't See You Leave	Patrick, l'amant de Nadège	Philippe Clair (dir)
1986	Deux enfoirés à Saint-Tropez	Julius	Max Pécas (dir)
1987	La Rumba	Paul Bergerac	Roger Hanin (dir)
1987	En toute innocence	Didier	Alain Jessua (dir)
1988	In extremis	Tango	Olivier Lorsac (dir)
1989	Cher frangin	Lt. Marillier	Gérard Mordillat (dir)
1991	Milena	Von Vollmar	Véra Belmont (dir)
1992	Les Eaux dormantes	Denis de Lespinière	Jacques Tréfouël (dir)
1993	The Washing Machine	Inspector Alexander Stacev	Ruggero Deodato (dir)
2000	Les Savates du bon Dieu	Jacques	Jean-Luc Brisseau (dir)
2000	Stardom	French TV Journalist	Denys Arcand (dir)
2006	Come le formiche	Nicolas	Ilaria Borrelli (dir)
2006	Je pense à vous	Maître Rivière	Pascal Bonitzer (dir)
2008	Les Randonneurs à Saint-Tropez	Paul Herbert	Philippe Harel (dir)
2009	Tricheuse	J.B.	Jean-François Davy (dir)
2013	Retour à la vie (Talking to the Trees)	Unknown	Ilaria Borrelli (dir)
2014	Valentin Valentin	La patron de la SRPJ	Pascal Thomas (dir)
2017	Vive la crise	Président Fassola	Jean-François Davy (dir)
2017	L'Orage Africain - Un continent sous influence	Unknown	Sylvestre Amoussou (dir)
2018	Moi et le Che	L'éditeur	Patrice Gautier (dir)
2019	Maria, Regina Romaniei (Queen Marie of Romania)	Conte de Saint-Aulaire	Alexis Cahill (dir)
2021	And he said yes	Rupert	Short film. Gintare Parulyte (dir)
2023	Ténèbres	Unknown	Clément Poirier (dir)

=== Television ===
Philippe Caroit television credits
Year	Title	Role	Notes	Ref.
1981	Télévision de chambre	Laurent, le marié	Episode: "Les Ombres", Jean-Claude Brisseau (dir)	
1982	Les Secrets de la princesse de Cadignan	Michel Chrestien	Jacques Deray (dir)	
1982	Marion	Patrick - fiancé de Denise	Episode: "Qui trop efface" (S1.E4), Jean Pignol (dir)	
1983	Les beaux quartiers	Adrien	Jean Kerchbron (dir)	
1985	Le Diable dans le bénitier	Jean-Paul	Jean L'Hôte (dir)	
1986	Série rose	Unknown	Episode: "Le Libertin de qualité" (S1.E5), Juan Luis Buñuel (dir)	
1986	Série noire	Florian	La nuit du flinguer (S1.E20), Pierre Grimblat (dir)	
1988	Melba	Duc d'Orleans	Episodes: S1.E3–6, Roger McDonald (dir)	
1988	Sueurs froides	Le docteur	Episode: "Coup de pouce" (S1.E18), Josée Dayan (dir)	
1989	V comme vengeance	Patrick Martivaux	"Un amour tardif" (S1.E1), Patrick Jamain (dir)	
1989–1991	Coplan	Coplan	Episodes: S1.E1–5	
1990	V comme vengeance	Pierre Martana	"Au-delà de la vengeance" (S1.E6), Renaud Saint-Pierre (dir)	
1992	Missione d'amore	Padre Sandro	Dino Risi (dir)	
1992	Counterstrike	Luigi Di Marco	Episode: "The Sting" (S3.E2), René Bonnière (dir)	
1993	Les Grandes Marées	Jean Lestour	Episodes: S1.E1–8, Jean Sagols (dir)	
1993	Le Siècle des Lumières	Saint Affrique	Humberto Solás (dir)	
1993–1994	Cancoon	Pierre Depary	Episodes: S1.E1–4, Jean Sagols and Paolo Barzman (dir)	
1995–2001	Les Bœuf-carottes	David Kaan	9 episodes	
1999	Tramontane	Paul	Episodes: S1.E1–5, Henri Helman (dir)	
1999	Highlander: The Raven	Inspector Colbert	Episode: "The Frame" (S1.E16), Georges Mendeluk (dir)	
2000	La tribu de Zoé	Mathieu	Pierre Joassin (dir)	
2001	Death Train to the Pacific	Junior	Hans Werner (dir)	
2001	Méditerranée	Pascal Bobbio	Episodes: S1.E1–2, E5, Henri Helman (dir)	
2001	Il bello delle donne	Aldo Morelli	Episode: "Marzo - madre e figlia" (S1.E7), Luigi Parisi (dir)	
2003	Le Bleu de l'océan	Clément Malet	Episodes: S1.E1–5, Didier Albert (dir)	
2003	Une femme si parfaite	Marc Sulznyckie	Bernard Uzan (dir)	
2003	Spooks / MI-5	Jean-Luc (uncredited)	Episode: "Clean Skin" (S2.E7), Ciaran Donnelly (dir)	
2004	Imperium: Nero	Apollonius	Paul Marcus (dir)	
2005	Un transat pour huit	Pierre	Pierre Joassin (dir)	
2005	Trois femmes…un soir d'été	Le commandant Moriset	Episodes: S1.E1–4, Sébastien Grall (dir)	
2005	Sauveur Giordano	Le docteur Faroux	Episode: "L'envers du décor" (S1.E9), Klaus Biedermann (dir)	
2005	La Voie de Laura	Jérôme	Gérard Cuq (dir)	
2005	Trois femmes flics	Le Commandant Moriset	Episodes: S1.E1–6, Philippe Triboit (dir)	
2006	Joséphine, ange gardien	Thomas	La couleur de l'amour (S10.E1), Laurent Levy (dir)	
2006	Chassé croisé amoureux	Unknown	Gérard Cuq (dir)	
2007–2010	RIS police scientifique	Gilles Sagnac	Episodes: S3.E21–30, S4.E31–46, S5.E47–64, S6.E65–68	
2011	Camping Paradise	Thierry	Episode: "Miracle au camping" (S2.E4), Philippe Proteau (dir)	
2011	Merci Patron	Unknown	Pierre Joassin (dir)	
2011	Commissaire Magellan	Lucas Barbier	Episode: "Mort subite" (S2.E2), Etienne Dhaene (dir)	
2012	Toussaint Louverture	Bayon	Philippe Niang (dir)	
2013	Joséphine, ange gardien	Christophe Giovanni	Episode: "En roue Libre" (S14.E2), Philippe Proteau (dir)	
2014	Die Staatsaffäre	Guy Dupont, französische Staatspräsident	Michael Rowitz (dir)	
2014	Crimes et botanique	Bruno Volker	Episode: "Le Jardin des papillons noirs" (S1E2), Bruno Garcia (dir)	
2015	Meurtres à La Rochelle	Raphaël Weiss	Etienne Dhaene (dir)	
2016	Mallory	Mallory	François Guérin (dir)	
2017	Camping Paradis	Stéphane	Episode: "Miss Camping" (S8.E4), Marwen Abdallah (dir)	
2017	Le Prix de la vérité	Unknown	Emmanuel Rigaut (dir)	
2017–2020	Über die Grenze	Yves Kleber	Episodes: S1.E1–4, Michael Rowitz (dir)	
2017	Munch	Rodolphe Dulax	Episode: "Le process" (S1.E8), Nicolas Guicheteau (dir)	
2018–2020	Crimes Parfaits	Damien Roche	Episodes: S1.E5–6, S2.E7–8, S3.E7–8	
2019	La Malédiction du volcan	Edouard de Richebourg	Marwen Abdallah (dir)	
2020	Meurtres à Cayenne	Antoine Lagarde	Marc Barrat (dir)	
2021	Cassandre	Marc Lanvin	Episode: "Les régates" (S6.E2), Eric Le Roux (dir)	
2024	Parizot	Jean-Dominique Saint-Ulrich	Nicolas Copin (dir)	
2024	À qui profite le doute?	Giovanni Costello	Stéphanie Tchou-Cotta (dir)	
2025	Meurtres à Saint-Martin	Dr. Pasteur	François Guérin (dir)	
2025	Les Mystères des grottes du Régulus	Jean-Marc Monnier	Lorie Pester (dir)	
2025	Sans Retour (formerly: D'écume et de sang)	Pierre Theroux	Julien Seri (dir)	
