= Small Achievable Goals =

Canadian television series

- Genre: Sitcom
- Created by: Jennifer Whalen; Meredith MacNeill
- Starring: Jennifer Whalen; Meredith MacNeill
- Country of origin: Canada
- No. of seasons: 2
- No. of episodes: 16

Production
- Production companies: Sphere Productions; Sphere Abucus

Original release
- Network: CBC
- Release: February 25, 2025 – March 17, 2026

Small Achievable Goals is a Canadian television sitcom created by Jennifer Whalen and Meredith MacNeill that premiered on February 25, 2025, on CBC Television. The series stars Whalen and MacNeill as Julie and Kris, two women who are forced to work together to produce a podcast just as they have both begun menopause. On May 26, 2026, the series was canceled after two seasons.

== Cast ==
The series stars Jennifer Whalen and Meredith MacNeill. The supporting cast includes Alexander Nunez, Leslie Adlam, Tricia Black, Paul Braunstein, Kevin Whalen, Jon Dore, Kiori Mirza Waldman, Georgie Murphy, Tamara Podemski, Evan Mok, Billy MacLellan, Kirsten Rasmussen, Gord Rand, Evany Rosen, Kris Siddiqi, and Peter Keleghan.

== Episodes ==
Season	Episodes	Originally released	
Season	Episodes	First released	Last released
1	8	February 25, 2025	April 15, 2025
2	8	January 6, 2026	March 17, 2026

=== Season 1 (2025) ===
No. overall	No. in season	Title	Directed by	Written by	Original release date	Prod. code
1	1	"Judy Bloomed"	Zoe Hopkins	Jennifer Whalen & Meredith MacNeill	February 25, 2025	481785-1
2	2	"The One"	Zoe Hopkins	Meredith MacNeill & Jennifer Whalen	March 11, 2025	481785-2
3	3	"Good Sex"	Zoe Hopkins	Anita Kapila & Jason Ip	March 18, 2025	481785-3
4	4	"The HR Seminar"	Fab Filippo	Tricia Fish	March 25, 2025	481785-4
5	5	"Work Wife Balance"	Fab Filippo	Jennifer Goodhue	April 1, 2025	481785-5
6	6	"Making Work Friends"	Fab Filippo	Jenn Engels	April 8, 2025	481785-6
7	7	"Conscious Uncoupling"	Aleysa Young	Anita Kapila	April 15, 2025	481785-7
8	8	"Family Matters"	Aleysa Young	JP Larocque	April 15, 2025	481785-8

=== Season 2 (2026) ===
No. overall	No. in season	Title	Directed by	Written by	Original release date	Prod. code
9	1	"Hold My Finger"	Aleysa Young	Meredith MacNeill & Jennifer Whalen	January 6, 2026	481785-9
10	2	"A Helmet and a T-Rex"	Aleysa Young	Jessica Meya	January 13, 2026	481785-10
11	3	"Meno-Junk"	Aleysa Young	Kathleen Phillips	January 20, 2026	481785-11
12	4	"HRT, and Other Party Tricks"	Cory Bowles	Alexander Nunez	January 27, 2026	481785-12
13	5	"Tingles with Inga"	Cory Bowles	Jennifer Goodhue	February 3, 2026	481785-13
14	6	"I Surrender"	Cory Bowles	Kathleen Phillips & Jessica Meya	February 24, 2026	481785-14
15	7	"Menopause Resistant"	Yael Staav	Adam Pettle	March 3, 2026	481785-15
16	8	"Cicadas"	Yael Staav	Meredith MacNeill & Jennifer Whalen	March 17, 2026	481785-16
