= UNESCO Special Envoy =

UNESCO Special Envoys are personalities associated with various UNESCO programmes and projects who help to spread UNESCO’s message worldwide through their professional activities and their personal charisma.

The following is a list of UNESCO Special Envoys along with the position they are currently assuming:

- (Switzerland) Metin Arditi, UNESCO Honorary Ambassador and Special Envoy for Intercultural Dialogue since 2014,
- (France) Beate Klarsfeld and Serge Klarsfeld, UNESCO Honorary Ambassadors and Special Envoys for Education about the History of Holocaust and Genocide Prevention since October 2015,
- (Qatar) Sheikha Mozah Bint Nasser Al-Missned, Special Envoy for Basic and Higher Education since January 2003,
- (United States) Judith Pisar, UNESCO Special Envoy for Cultural Diplomacy since June 2017,
- (Russia) Mintimer Shaimiev, UNESCO Special Envoy for Interculural Dialogue since August 2017,
- (United States) Forest Whitaker, UNESCO Special Envoy for Peace and Reconciliation since June 2011,
- (Kenya) Mwai Kibaki, UNESCO Special Envoy for water in Africa since April 2016,
- Princess Laurentien of the Netherlands, UNESCO Special Envoy on Literacy for Development since 2009,
- (China) Peng Liyuan, UNESCO Special Envoy for the Advancement of Girl's and Women’s Education since March 2014,
- (France) Hedva Ser, UNESCO Goodwill Ambassador and Special Envoy for Cultural Diplomacy since March 2017,
- (Jordan) Princess Sumaya bint Hassan, UNESCO Special Envoy for Science for Peace since October 2017.

== Former Envoys ==
- (Saudi Arabia) Prince Talal ibn Abd al-Aziz (1931-2018) - Special Envoy for Water
- (Canada) The Right Honourable Michaëlle Jean - Special Envoy for Haiti, resigned in 2014
- (United States) Samuel Pisar (1929-2015) - Honorary Ambassador and Special Envoy for Holocaust Education

== See also ==
- UNESCO Goodwill Ambassador
- UNESCO Champion for Sport
- UNESCO Artist for Peace
