= Hedva Ser =

French artist, painter and sculptor

- חדוה סר
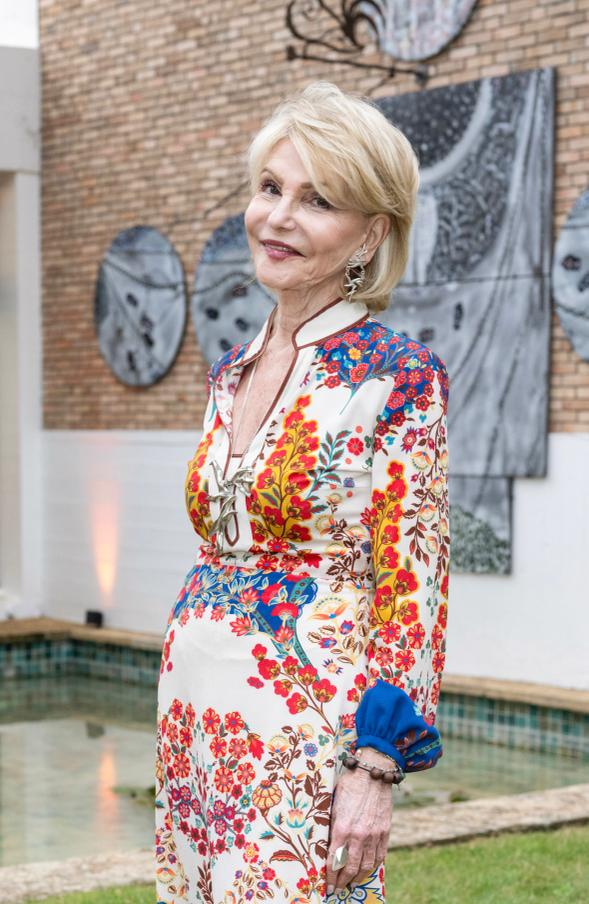
- Hedva Ser in 2022
- Born: September 20, 1948 (age 77); Petah Tikva, Israel
- Occupations: Artist, painter, sculptor

Hedva Ser (Hebrew: חדוה סר; born September 20, 1948) is a French artist, painter and sculptor. She is a UNESCO Artist for Peace and is known for creating tapestries and jewellery.

== Biography ==
Hedva Ser trained from 1964 to 1966 at the youth department of the Tel Aviv Museum of Art, then in 1966 at the Académie de la Grande Chaumière in Paris and from 1967 to 1970 at the Centre d'art technique Camondo. In 1970, she went to the Hornsey College of Art in London.

After painting, she began working in tapestry, which she developed in her own way by introducing a new relief technique.

In 1975, she met the Argentinian sculptor Alicia Penalba. From 1982, Hedva Ser fully practiced sculpture.

In 1984, she designed the sets for Jacques Chancel's Grand Échiquier, which reinforced her growing reputation.

Hedva Ser has completed numerous major projects in France, in Rocquencourt, Paris, Sophia Antipolis, as well as public and private commissions in Switzerland, Israel and the United States.

Numerous solo exhibitions have been devoted to her work at the French Institute in Athens (1983), the Picasso Museum in Antibes (1988), Harvard University (1992), the Tapestry Museum in Aubusson (1998), the Tel Aviv Museum of Art (1999), the Artcurial Gallery in Paris (1999), Monaco (2000), the Panijel Gallery in Paris (2005 and 2006) and the Ermano Tedeschi Gallery in Milan (2007).

A retrospective of his work was presented at the town hall of the 16th arrondissement of Paris (2010) and a solo show at the Galerie Pierre-Alain Challier in Paris (2011).

As part of her fight for intercultural dialogue, she has been inaugurating her traveling sculpture The Tree of Peace all over the world since 2007. Between July 2017 and January 2018, after being installed on Place du Louvre in Paris, it was placed on the forecourt of the town hall of the 16th arrondissement, then again at this location from 2021.

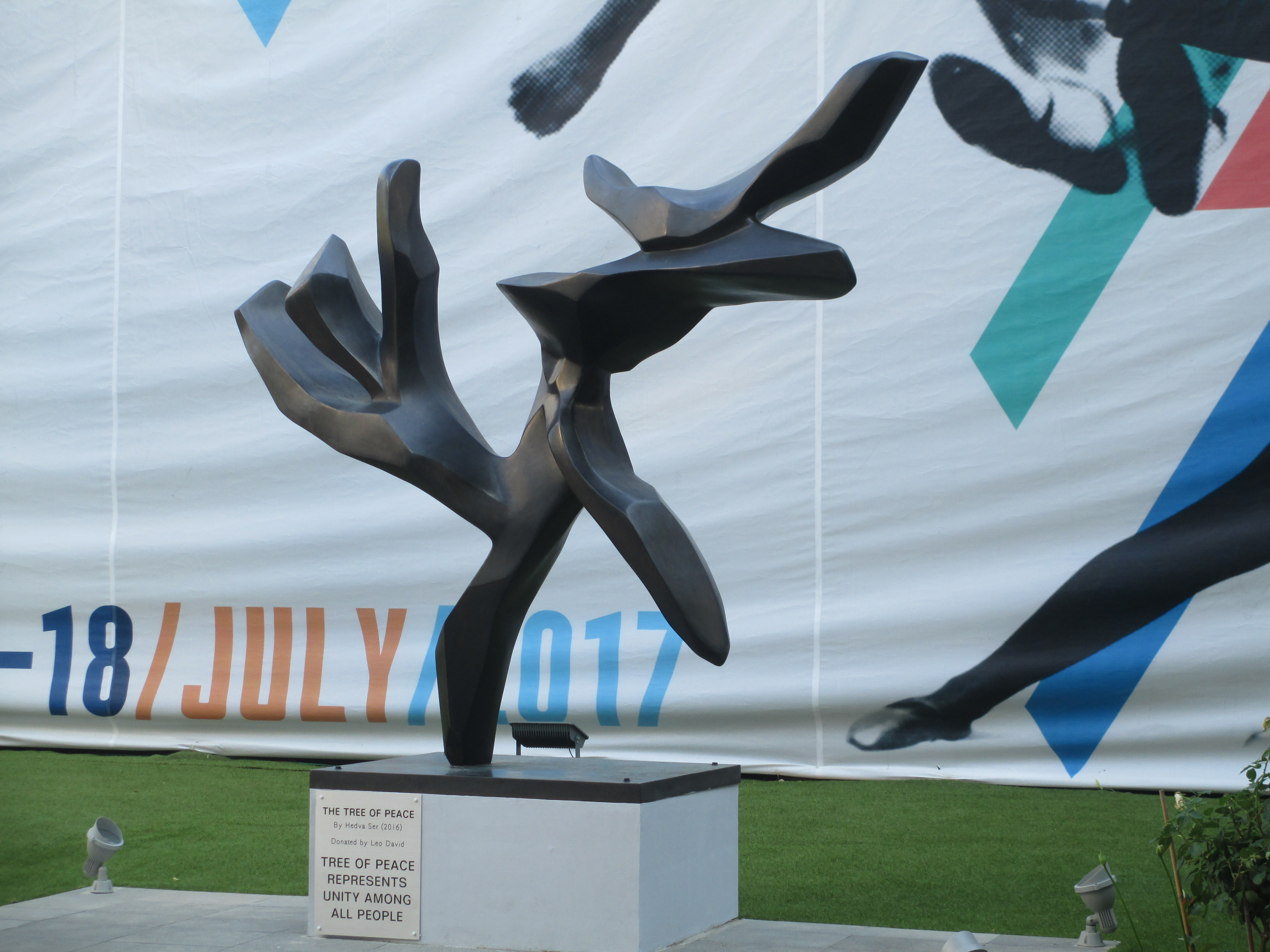
Tree of Peace (2016)

Her work was shown at the Hebrew University of Jerusalem (December 2007); Still University in Mesa, Arizona (May 2011); Temple University in Philadelphia, Pennsylvania (May 2012); al-Quds University in Palestine (July 2013); the Presidential Garden of the Verdala Palace in Malta (March 2014); Harvard University in Cambridge, Massachusetts (June 2014); Ordino in the Principality of Andorra (July 2014); Baku, Azerbaijan (May 2015); the Garden of Nations, Berlin, Germany (July 2015); Kfar Maccabiah in Israel (May 2016); and the University of Strasbourg, France (July 2016).

In 2001, she was named a Knight of the Legion of Honour and an Officer of Arts and Letters. In 2017, she became a UNESCO Goodwill Ambassador and UNESCO Special Envoy for Cultural Diplomacy.

== Personal life ==
Hedva Ser has two children, Guy-Philippe Goldstein and Diane Goldstein.

== Works ==
=== Group exhibitions ===
Her first participation in the Salon de Mai at the Paris City Hall dates back to 1978. She has been present at numerous events, notably in 2008 at the exhibition of monumental sculptures on the Champs-Élysées.

- 2012, sculptures, Galerie Malborough, Monaco.
- 2008 :
  - Sculptures monumentales sur les Champs-Élysées, Paris.
  - Réalisation de trophées « Prix SER », Prix Cinéma Patrimoine de Paris.
  - Rencontres d'Étoiles, Prix remis lors du XIe Bal de Paris, dans les salons de l'Automobile Club de France, place de la Concorde, Paris.
- 2007 :
  - Dialogues méditerranéens, sculpture monumentale Totem, terrasse de la Citadelle, Saint-Tropez, France.
  - Galerie Malborough, Monaco.
  - tapestries, Salon d'automne, Paris.
- 2002, bijoux, Galerie Malborough, Monaco.
- 2000, La Subbia, Pietrasanta, Italie.
- 1997, tapestries, Beauvais, France.
- 1995, tapestries, Beauvais, France.
- 1987 :
  - tapestries, Grand Palais, Paris.
  - Grand Prix de la Tapisserie.
  - tapestries, National Museum of Women in the Arts, Washington DC.
- 1986 :
  - tapestries, Hôtel de Ville, Paris.
  - Salon de mai, Hôtel de Ville, Paris.
  - Grand Palais, Paris.
- 1984, tapestries, palais du Luxembourg, Paris.
- 1982, tapestries, Salon d'automne, Paris.
- 1979, Salon de mai, Hôtel de Ville, Paris.
- 1978, Salon de mai, Hôtel de Ville, Paris.

=== Personal exhibitions ===
- 2014, « Destruction and Rebirth », musée Galicia, Cracovie, Pologne.
- 2013 :
  - Solo Show, galerie Sparta, Los Angeles, États-Unis.
  - « Shafts & Forms », Emon Gallery, Tokyo, Japon.
- 2012, « Au fil de la sculpture », Galerie Pierre-Alain Challier, Paris.
- 2010, rétrospective, mairie du 16e arrondissement, Paris.
- 2007, sculptures, Galerie Ermanno Tedeschi, Milan.
- 2004, sculptures, Plaza Athénée, Paris.
- 2006, sculptures, Galerie Panijel, Paris.
- 2003, sculptures et tapisseries, Galerie du Luxembourg et Crédit lyonnais, France.
- 2000 :
  - Tapisseries, Parlement d'Israël.
  - Galerie Artcurial, Monaco.
- 1999 :
  - Museum of Art Tel Aviv, Israël.
  - Institut français d'Israël, Israël.
- 1998 :
  - Musée de la Tapisserie, Aubusson, France.
  - Sculptures et bijoux, Artcurial, Paris.
- 1992, Dudley House, université Harvard, Boston.
- 1988, tapisseries et sculptures, musée Picasso d'Antibes, France.
- 1987, Galerie Robert Four, Paris.
- 1984, tapisseries, Galerie Robert Four, Paris.
- 1983, tapisseries et peintures, Club de la Presse et des Médias, Paris.
- 1981 :
  - Tapisseries, Institut français d’Athènes.
  - Tapisseries, Galerie Felicie, New York.
- 1980 :
  - Tapisseries, Institut français de Tel Aviv, Israël.
  - Tapisseries, Sophia Antipolis, France.
- 1977, peintures, Galerie Françoise Tournie, Paris.

=== Projects - achievements ===
- 2019 :
  - Inauguration de l'Arbre de la Paix au Luxembourg.
  - Inauguration de l'Arbre de la Paix, parc Rizareios, Athènes, Grèce.
- 2017, Inauguration du jardin de l'Espoir à Cracovie avec le groupe du sculptures monumentales Destruction & Rebirth.
- 2016 :
  - Inauguration du 10e Arbre de la Paix, de 3 mètres de haut, à Kfar Maccabia en Israël, le village du sport international qui accueille les Jeux olympiques juifs rassemblant les sportifs juifs du monde.
  - Inauguration du 11e Arbre de la Paix à l’université dentaire de Strasbourg.
- 2015 :
  - Inauguration d'un Arbre de la Paix de 3 mètres de haut à Bakou en Azerbaïdjan, pour l'inauguration de la 3e édition du Forum international sur le dialogue interculturel.
  - Inauguration du 9e Arbre de la Paix à Berlin, dans le jardin des Nations, pour célébrer le 50e anniversaire de la reprise des relations diplomatiques entre l’Allemagne et Israël.
- 2014 :
  - Inauguration de l'Arbre de la Paix, sculpture monumentale, jardin du palais Verdala, Malte.
  - Inauguration de l'Arbre de la Paix, sculpture monumentale, université Harvard, Boston, États-Unis.
  - Inauguration de l'Arbre de la Paix, sculpture monumentale, Ordino, Andorre.
- 2013, Inauguration de l'Arbre de la Paix, sculpture monumentale, université al-Qods, Jérusalem Est.
- 2012 :
  - Inauguration de l'Arbre de la Paix, sculpture monumentale, Temple University, Philadelphie, États-Unis.
  - Marraine de « Art Camp Andorra » et participation à l'exposition collective.
- 2011, inauguration de l'Arbre de la Paix, sculpture monumentale, Still University, Arizona, États-Unis.
- 2009, réalisation de la sculpture Trophée de l'ensemble Shalom-Salam, à l'occasion du 60e anniversaire de l'Institut Weizmann à Paris.
- 2007, inauguration de l'Arbre de la Paix, sculpture monumentale sur l'esplanade de l'université hébraïque de Jérusalem, Israël.
- 2002, inauguration de Réunification (de la série « Métamorphoses » ), sculpture monumentale, Conseil départemental de l'Oise, France.
- 2000, inauguration de l'Arbre de Vie, sculpture monumentale, Institut Weizmann des Sciences, Rehovot, Israël.
- 1990 :
  - Réalisation de tableaux et tapisseries pour le siège social du groupe ELF, Moscou, Russie.
  - Réalisation d'une tapisserie pour le groupe PROMODES, Paris, France.
  - Réalisation d'une tapisserie pour la société OPTORG, Paris, France.
  - Réalisation d'une tapisserie et de sculptures pour la société CREMONINI, Italie.
- 1989, Réalisation d'une tapisserie pour le bureau de la direction Banque Union des Mines-La Hénin, Paris, France.
- 1988, Commande pour le siège social de la société NAEF, Genève, Suisse.
- 1985, Réalisation des décors du Grand Échiquier de Jacques Chancel sur Antenne 2.
- 1983, Réalisation d'une fontaine vitrail lumineuse pour l'INRIA, Sophia Antipolis, Montpellier, France.
- 1978, Expositions et projets au centre hospitalier de Juvisy, France.
- 1977, Réalisation d'une fresque murale à la clinique de la Roseraie, Aubervilliers, France.
- 1976, Aménagements de façade pour la résidence pour personnes âgées Jean-Rostand, département de l'Essonne, France.
- 1974, Aménagements de bureaux pour un conseil administratif, département de l'Essonne, France.
- 1973, Aménagements intérieurs du siège social Bertrand Faure, Rocquencourt, France.

== Distinctions ==
- Officier de l'ordre des Arts et des Lettres (2000)
- Chevalière de la Légion d'honneur (décret du 30 décembre 2000),
- Ambassadrice de bonne volonté et envoyée spéciale de l'UNESCO pour la diplomatie culturelle (2017).

== Bibliography ==
- Arturo Schwarz, Hedva Ser, Au fil de la sculpture, Beaux Arts éditions, 2011 ISBN 978-2-84278-890-2 (édition bilingue français-anglais).
