= Caroline Tresca =

French television and radio presenter (born 1959)

- Born: Marie Caroline d'Indy; 21 July 1959 (age 66); Angers, Maine-et-Loire, France
- Occupations: Television presenter, producer, director, radio presenter, actress, painter, sculptor, writer
- Notable credit(s): Ce soir ou jamais À vos amours
- Television: FR3 (1986–93)

Caroline Tresca (born Marie Caroline d'Indy on 21 July 1959) is a French television and radio presenter, as well as a film, television and stage actress. She focuses today on her occupation of painter and sculptor, and owns her own art gallery in Paris.

== Early life and education ==
Caroline Tresca was born in Angers in the department of Maine-et-Loire. She is the great-granddaughter of the composer Vincent d'Indy. In 1980, she graduated with a university degree in law.

After a world trip in 1981, she had a career in modeling from 1982 to 1986. She then took classes of improvisation at the American Center of Paris.

== Television and radio career ==
She ended her modeling career while she began in television on channel FR3 presenting various programs such as Télé Caroline, Chapiteau 3, Dadou Babou and 40° à l'ombre de la 3. The year of her television debut, in 1986, was also the one where she had her only film role offered by Max Pécas in Deux enfoirés à Saint-Tropez. In 1990, still on FR3, she produced and presented two programs, Ce soir ou jamais and from 1991 à 1993, À vos amours, broadcast on Sunday evenings. Her years spent on television were honored in 1989 by the 7 d'Or for best television presenter.

She quit her career as a television presenter and producer, to focus on radio, where she presents the morning news on Europe 1. She was awarded of the Galère d'Or for best French radio presenter.

== Acting career ==
From 1993 to 1999, she played in a number of television films like Les Grandes Personnes in 1995, as well as television series like Les Alsaciens ou les Deux Mathilde. These few years as an actress permitted her to play with famous actors like Francis Huster, François Berléand, Annie Girardot and Line Renaud.

At the end of the 1990s, she ended her career as television actress for the theater. She appeared in 8 plays including Madame Doubtfire at the Théâtre de Paris. She still pursues her career in theater, in La Règle de trois, played in 2010.

== Painting and sculpture ==
Caroline Tresca has never taken painting classes, which makes her an autodidact, but she took classes of sculpture. In February 2003, she exposed at the Galerie Bouquières in Toulouse. Her exposure is titled Pastels, dessins, huiles et sculptures. In November and December 2005, she was at the Galerie Carré des Coignards at Nogent-sur-Marne. In November 2007, she exhibited at the Galerie Artcourt in Paris. Her exposure is titled Féminin Pluriel.

In June 2009, she exposed at the Carrousel du Louvre for two days. She owns an art exhibition at the Galerie Martine Moisan (Galerie Vivienne) in Paris. In September 2013, the Galerie Caroline Tresca, opened in the 6th arrondissement of Paris.

== Personal life ==
Caroline Tresca was the partner of actor Philippe Caroit until 2008. She is mother of two daughters and one son.
