= UNESCO Champion for Sport =

UNESCO Champions for Sport are international celebrity sport personalities advocates for the United Nations agency UNESCO. This family of world-class athletes purveys UNESCO's message the world over. As well, they reflect UNESCO's concerns to promote the values of physical education and sports with a view of building a better future for younger generations.

== Current list ==
Currently, twelve personalities are designated UNESCO Champion for Sport:

Name	Country	since	sport	Link
Maya Gabeira	Brazil	2022	surfer	
Nadia Nadim	Afghanistan/Denmark	2019	association football	
Hristo Stoichkov	Bulgaria	2016	association football	
Michael Schumacher	Germany	2002	Formula One racing	

== See also ==
- UNESCO Goodwill Ambassador
- UNESCO Special Envoy
- UNESCO Artist for Peace
