= Baroness von Sketch Show =

Canadian television series 2016–2021

- Genre: Sketch comedy
- Created by: Carolyn Taylor; Meredith MacNeill; Aurora Browne; Jennifer Whalen
- Directed by: Aleysa Young; Yael Staav; Jordan Canning; Jeremy Lalonde
- Starring: Carolyn Taylor; Meredith MacNeill; Aurora Browne; Jennifer Whalen
- Opening theme: "Dancing Underwater" by Brave Shores
- Ending theme: "Watch and Learn" by Marcus Thompson
- Composers: Brendan Canning; Ohad Benchtrit
- Country of origin: Canada
- Original language: English
- No. of seasons: 5
- No. of episodes: 46

Production
- Executive producers: Jamie Brown; Carolyn Taylor; Meredith MacNeill; Aurora Browne; Jennifer Whalen
- Producers: Graham Ludlow; Jeff Peeler
- Running time: 22 minutes (approx.)
- Production company: Frantic Films

Original release
- Network: CBC Television
- Release: June 14, 2016 – February 2, 2021

Baroness von Sketch Show is a Canadian sketch comedy television series. It debuted on CBC Television on June 14, 2016. Produced by Frantic Films, the series is an all-female comedy series starring Carolyn Taylor, Meredith MacNeill, Aurora Browne and Jennifer Whalen. The four also serve as executive producers of the show.

CBC renewed the show for a second season, which aired in 2017. The show's third season started in September 2018, and CBC renewed the show for a fourth season, that began airing shows in October 2019. CBC has announced that the show would continue with a 5th and final season starting October 6, 2020.

The show also airs on IFC in the United States. The show is a three-time winner of the Canadian Screen Award for Best Sketch Comedy Program or Series, winning at the 5th Canadian Screen Awards in 2017, the 6th Canadian Screen Awards in 2018, and the 7th Canadian Screen Awards in 2019.

== Cast ==
- Jennifer Whalen
- Aurora Browne
- Carolyn Taylor
- Meredith MacNeill

== Episodes ==
Season	Episodes	Originally released	
Season	Episodes	First released	Last released
1	6	June 14, 2016	July 19, 2016
2	7	June 27, 2017	August 8, 2017
3	10	September 18, 2018	November 20, 2018
4	10	October 31, 2019	November 28, 2019
5	13	October 6, 2020	February 2, 2021

=== Season 1 (2016) ===
No. overall	No. in season	Title	Directed by	Written by	Original release date
1	1	"I Can't Believe This Used To Take Days"	Aleysa Young	Carolyn Taylor, Meredith MacNeill, Jennifer Whalen, Jen Goodhue, Dawn Whitwell, Monica Heisey, Mae Martin	June 14, 2016
2	2	"Last Year You Weren't Forty"	Aleysa Young	Carolyn Taylor, Meredith MacNeill, Jennifer Whalen, Jen Goodhue, Dawn Whitwell, Mae Martin	June 21, 2016
3	3	"We've Lost Communication"	Aleysa Young	Carolyn Taylor, Meredith MacNeill, Jennifer Whalen, Jen Goodhue, Dawn Whitwell, Monica Heisey	June 28, 2016
4	4	"If The Killer Is Watching"	Aleysa Young	Carolyn Taylor, Meredith MacNeill, Jennifer Whalen, Jen Goodhue, Dawn Whitwell, Monica Heisey, Mae Martin	July 5, 2016
5	5	"Stay for a Drink"	Aleysa Young	Carolyn Taylor, Meredith MacNeill, Jennifer Whalen, Jen Goodhue, Dawn Whitwell, Monica Heisey	July 12, 2016
6	6	"2CatShaPurr"	Aleysa Young	Carolyn Taylor, Meredith MacNeill, Jennifer Whalen, Jen Goodhue, Dawn Whitwell, Mae Martin	July 19, 2016

=== Season 2 (2017) ===
No. overall	No. in season	Title	Directed by	Written by	Original release date
7	1	"It Satisfies on a Very Basic Level"	Yael Staav	Carolyn Taylor, Meredith MacNeill, Aurora Browne, Jennifer Whalen, Jennifer Goodhue, Monica Heisey, Mae Martin, Zoe Whittall	June 27, 2017
8	2	"Don't Call Me Ma'am"	Yael Staav	Carolyn Taylor, Meredith MacNeill, Jennifer Whalen, Aurora Browne, Jennifer Goodhue, Monica Heisey	July 4, 2017
9	3	"I Can't Vote"	Yael Staav	Carolyn Taylor, Meredith MacNeill, Jennifer Whalen, Aurora Browne, Jennifer Goodhue, Monica Heisey	July 11, 2017
10	4	"Taco and a Hair Flip"	Yael Staav	Carolyn Taylor, Meredith MacNeill, Aurora Browne, Jennifer Whalen, Jen Goodhue, Monica Heisey	July 18, 2017
11	5	"Don't Make Me Send a Lawyer Up There"	Yael Staav	Carolyn Taylor, Meredith MacNeill, Aurora Browne, Jennifer Whalen, Jen Goodhue, Monica Heisey	July 25, 2017
12	6	"It's a Garment of Liberty"	Yael Staav	Carolyn Taylor, Meredith MacNeill, Aurora Browne, Jennifer Whalen, Jen Goodhue, Monica Heisey	August 1, 2017
13	7	"You've Reached the Voicemail of Tracy Herrity"	Yael Staav	Carolyn Taylor, Meredith MacNeill, Jennifer Whalen, Aurora Browne, Jennifer Goodhue, Monica Heisey	August 8, 2017

=== Season 3 (2018) ===
No. overall	No. in season	Title	Directed by	Written by	Original release date
14	1	"Is That You Karen?"	Jordan Canning, Jeremy Lalonde	Carolyn Taylor, Meredith MacNeill, Aurora Browne, Jennifer Whalen, Jen Goodhue, Monica Heisey	September 18, 2018
15	2	"Tonight Is Spaghetti Thursday"	Jordan Canning, Jeremy Lalonde	Carolyn Taylor, Meredith MacNeill, Aurora Browne, Jennifer Whalen, Jen Goodhue, Monica Heisey	September 25, 2018
16	3	"Don't Even Say Goodbye Just Go"	Jordan Canning, Jeremy Lalonde	Carolyn Taylor, Meredith MacNeill, Aurora Browne, Jennifer Whalen, Jen Goodhue, Monica Heisey	October 2, 2018
17	4	"Sex and Things and Whispers"	Jordan Canning, Jeremy Lalonde	Carolyn Taylor, Meredith MacNeill, Aurora Browne, Jennifer Whalen, Jen Goodhue, Monica Heisey	October 9, 2018
18	5	"It's Because I Care"	Jordan Canning, Jeremy Lalonde	Carolyn Taylor, Meredith MacNeill, Aurora Browne, Jennifer Whalen, Jen Goodhue, Monica Heisey	October 16, 2018
19	6	"Buffin' Your Muffin"	Jordan Canning, Jeremy Lalonde	Carolyn Taylor, Meredith MacNeill, Aurora Browne, Jennifer Whalen, Jen Goodhue, Monica Heisey	October 23, 2018
20	7	"Summer of ’65"	Jordan Canning, Jeremy Lalonde	Carolyn Taylor, Meredith MacNeill, Aurora Browne, Jennifer Whalen, Jen Goodhue, Monica Heisey	October 30, 2018
21	8	"Sometimes It's Good to Be the Shaman"	Jordan Canning, Jeremy Lalonde	Carolyn Taylor, Meredith MacNeill, Aurora Browne, Jennifer Whalen, Jen Goodhue, Monica Heisey	November 6, 2018
22	9	"Start by Having Rich Parents"	Jordan Canning, Jeremy Lalonde	Carolyn Taylor, Meredith MacNeill, Aurora Browne, Jennifer Whalen, Jen Goodhue, Monica Heisey	November 13, 2018
23	10	"Bangs Do Not Define Me"	Jordan Canning, Jeremy Lalonde	Carolyn Taylor, Meredith MacNeill, Aurora Browne, Jennifer Whalen, Jen Goodhue, Monica Heisey	November 20, 2018

=== Season 4 (2019) ===
No. overall	No. in season	Title	Original release date
24	1	"Humanity is in an Awkward Stage"	September 17, 2019
25	2	"Something for Daddy"	September 24, 2019
26	3	"It's a Peachy Abomination"	October 1, 2019
27	4	"No One Wants To Be That Lady"	October 8, 2019
28	5	"I Always Order Wrong"	October 15, 2019
29	6	"Shangela Was Robbed"	October 22, 2019
30	7	"I Might Still Be Mad In A Week"	October 29, 2019
31	8	"There's A Special Place in Hell"	November 5, 2019
32	9	"My Instagram is Suffering"	November 12, 2019
33	10	"Those Chickens Won't Clean Themselves"	November 12, 2019

=== Season 5 (2020–2021) ===
No. overall	No. in season	Title	Original release date
34	1	"Whatever You Do, Don't Smell His T-Shirts"	October 6, 2020
35	2	"I Prefer the Term 'Bonus Parent'"	October 13, 2020
36	3	"Did an Eagle Steal Your Baby?"	October 20, 2020
37	4	"I've Got a Date With a Gnome and He Is Hawt"	October 27, 2020
38	5	"All I'm Saying Is Her Car Has Eyelashes"	November 10, 2020
Guest star: Debra McGrath
39	6	"Baby Toe Disease"	November 17, 2020
40	7	"Pénis Misérable"	November 24, 2020
41	8	"Don't Call Me Lady"	December 1, 2020
42	9	"Mercury Is in Retrograde"	January 5, 2021
43	10	"I Wrote a Play About My Ex"	January 12, 2021
44	11	"Women Love Breadcrumbs"	January 19, 2021
45	12	"Back of the Line Old Man"	January 26, 2021
46	13	"No One Steals the Kale"	February 2, 2021

== Awards ==
Award	Ceremony	Category	Nominee	Result	Ref(s)
Canadian Screen Awards	5th Canadian Screen Awards	Best Variety or Sketch Comedy Program or Series	Baroness von Sketch Show	Won	
Canadian Screen Awards	5th Canadian Screen Awards	Best Performance in a Variety or Sketch Comedy Program or Series	Carolyn Taylor, Meredith MacNeill, Aurora Browne, Jennifer Whalen	Nominated	
Canadian Screen Awards	5th Canadian Screen Awards	Best Editing in a Variety or Sketch Comedy Program or Series	Mark Fly, Jeremy LaLonde — "If the Killer Is Watching"	Won	
Canadian Screen Awards	5th Canadian Screen Awards	Best Direction in a Variety or Sketch Comedy Program or Series	Aleysa Young — "Last Year You Weren't Forty"	Nominated	
Canadian Screen Awards	5th Canadian Screen Awards	Best Writing in a Variety or Sketch Comedy Program or Series	Carolyn Taylor, Meredith MacNeill, Jennifer Whalen, Jennifer Goodhue, Dawn Whitwell, Monica Heisey, Mae Martin — "I Can't Believe This Used to Take Days"	Won	
Canadian Screen Awards	6th Canadian Screen Awards	Best Sketch Comedy Program or Series	Baroness von Sketch Show	Won	
Canadian Screen Awards	6th Canadian Screen Awards	Best Performance in a Variety or Sketch Comedy Program or Series	Carolyn Taylor, Meredith MacNeill, Aurora Browne, Jennifer Whalen	Won	
Canadian Screen Awards	6th Canadian Screen Awards	Best Photography in a Comedy Series	Christopher Mably — "It Satisfies on a Very Basic Level"	Nominated	
Canadian Screen Awards	6th Canadian Screen Awards	Best Editing in a Comedy Program or Series	Mike Fly, Jeremy LaLonde — "It Satisfies on a Very Basic Level"	Nominated	
Canadian Screen Awards	6th Canadian Screen Awards	Best Direction in a Variety or Sketch Comedy Program or Series	Yael Staav — "It Satisfies on a Very Basic Level"	Won	
Canadian Screen Awards	6th Canadian Screen Awards	Best Writing in a Variety or Sketch Comedy Program or Series	Carolyn Taylor, Meredith MacNeill, Aurora Browne, Jennifer Whalen, Jennifer Goodhue, Monica Heisey, Mae Martin, Zoe Whittall	Won	
Canadian Screen Awards	7th Canadian Screen Awards	Best Ensemble Performance in a Variety or Sketch Comedy Program or Series	Baroness von Sketch Show	Won	
Canadian Screen Awards	7th Canadian Screen Awards	Best Photography in a Comedy Series	Nick Haight — "Is that you Karen?"	Nominated	
Canadian Screen Awards	7th Canadian Screen Awards	Best Editing in a Comedy Series	Mike Fly, Marianna Khoury, Jeremy LaLonde, Stephen Withrow — "Is that you Karen?"	Nominated	
Canadian Screen Awards	7th Canadian Screen Awards	Best Direction in a Variety or Sketch Comedy Series	Jordan Canning, Jeremy LaLonde — "Is that you Karen?"	Won	
Canadian Screen Awards	7th Canadian Screen Awards	Best Writing in a Variety or Sketch Comedy Program or Series	Carolyn Taylor, Meredith MacNeill, Aurora Browne, Jennifer Whalen, Jennifer Goodhue, Monica Heisey — "Is that you Karen?"	Won	
Canadian Screen Awards	8th Canadian Screen Awards	Best Sketch Comedy Program or Series	Baroness von Sketch Show	Won	
Canadian Screen Awards	8th Canadian Screen Awards	Best Photography in a Comedy Series	Robert Scarborough — "Humanity Is in an Awkward Stage"	Won	
Canadian Screen Awards	8th Canadian Screen Awards	Best Editing in a Comedy Series	Mike Fly, Marianna Khoury, Aren Hansen, Sean Song, Nick Wong — "Humanity Is in an Awkward Stage"	Won	
Canadian Screen Awards	8th Canadian Screen Awards	Best Direction in a Variety or Sketch Comedy Program or Series	Jordan Canning, Aleysa Young — "Humanity Is in an Awkward Stage"	Won	
Canadian Screen Awards	8th Canadian Screen Awards	Best Writing in a Variety or Sketch Comedy Program or Series	Carolyn Taylor, Meredith MacNeill, Aurora Browne, Jennifer Whalen, Jennifer Goodhue, Allison Hogg, Becky Johnson, Moynan King, DJ Mausner — "Humanity Is in an Awkward Stage"	Won	
Canadian Screen Awards	9th Canadian Screen Awards	Best Comedy Series	Baroness von Sketch Show	Nominated	
Canadian Screen Awards	9th Canadian Screen Awards	Best Performance in a Variety or Sketch Comedy Program or Series	Carolyn Taylor, Meredith MacNeill, Aurora Browne, Jennifer Whalen	Won	
Canadian Screen Awards	9th Canadian Screen Awards	Best Costume Design	Nicole Manek — "Baby Toe Disease"	Nominated	
Canadian Screen Awards	9th Canadian Screen Awards	Best Editing in a Comedy Program or Series	Mike Fly, Marianna Khoury, Michael Pierro, "Morgan Waters" — "Whatever You Do, Don't Smell His T-Shirts"	Won	
Canadian Screen Awards	9th Canadian Screen Awards	Best Direction in a Variety or Sketch Comedy Program or Series	Vivieno Caldinelli, Joyce Wong	Won	
Canadian Screen Awards	9th Canadian Screen Awards	Best Writing in a Variety or Sketch Comedy Program or Series	Carolyn Taylor, Meredith MacNeill, Aurora Browne, Jennifer Whalen, Jennifer Goodhue, Monica Heisey, Allison Hogg, Adam Christie, Becky Johnson, Nelu Handa, Paloma Nuñez — "I Prefer the Term Bonus Parent"	Won	
