= Foundation for Interreligious and Intercultural Research and Dialogue =

Canadian charitable organization

The Foundation for Interreligious and Intercultural Research and Dialogue (FIIRD) is a registered charitable organization in Alberta, Canada.

The main program of the FIIRD is to enhance knowledge and the critical examination of the wellsprings of each religious tradition and then to acquire the linguistic and strategic tools needed to study the normative scriptures of these religions without syncretism or proselytism. It was founded in 1999, and sponsored by the Levant Foundation with the University of Geneva in Switzerland. FIIRD later became known as FIIDI.

== Projects and goals ==
In 2006 the FIIRD published a boxed set of three holy books: the Hebrew Bible, the New Testament, and the Holy Qur'an.

Another goal of the FIIRD, supported by the Levant Foundation, was to create a post-doctoral program at the University of Geneva in the field of interreligious and intercultural dialogue whereby several Fellows, each possessing a Ph.D. in multiple subjects, and those who are dedicated to further their knowledge and understanding of the monotheistic religions, participate in approved research and publish their results all done with the goal of searching for peace between the Abrahamic religions of Judaism, Christianity, and Islam.

== Activities and partnerships ==
In 2019, FIIDI partnered with Girls Not Brides.

In 2022, FIIDI partnered with the Hague Peace Project in Sierra Leone.

== Board of trustees ==
The Board of Trustees has included notable religious and political men, such as:

- Jamal Daniel, also FIIRD co-founder, current Vice President, and Trustee.
- Prince El Hassan bin Talal, of the Hashemite Kingdom of Jordan
- Cardinal Joseph Ratzinger (the future Pope Benedict XVI)
- Archbishop Michael L. Fitzgerald, Apostolic Nuncio in Egypt (who replaced Foundation co-founder and Trustee Joseph Cardinal Ratzinger, later Pope Benedict XVI)
- Chief Rabbi Rene-Samuel Sirat, former Chief Rabbi of France
- Sayyed Jawad Al-Khoei, Imam Al-Khoei Benevolent Foundation
- Emmanuel Adamakis, Metropolitan of France, Liaison Office of the Orthodox Church to the European Union
- Maitre Michel Halperin, Lawyer, Member of the Grand Conseil de la Republique et Canton de Geneve and its President in 2006
- Neil Bush, son of former President George H. W. Bush
- Professor Damaskinos Papandreou, former Metropolitan of Switzerland and Director of the Orthodox Center of the Ecumenical Patriarchate (Chambes/Geneva)

== List of FIIRD Fellows ==
- Leila El Bachiri
- Stefano Bigliardi
- Vito Evola
- Omar Fassatoui
- Naël Georges
- Guila-Clara Kessous
- Daniel Moulin-Stozek
- Ionut Untea
