= Family Circus Maximus =

Comedy play

Family Circus Maximus is a play produced by The Second City in Toronto. It won the 2002 Canadian Comedy Award for Best Comedic Play.

Comedian and actor Mae Martin and two friends became known as "the Groupies" for going to see the Family Circus Maximus 160 times in a year.
