= Ilaria Borrelli =

Italian film director

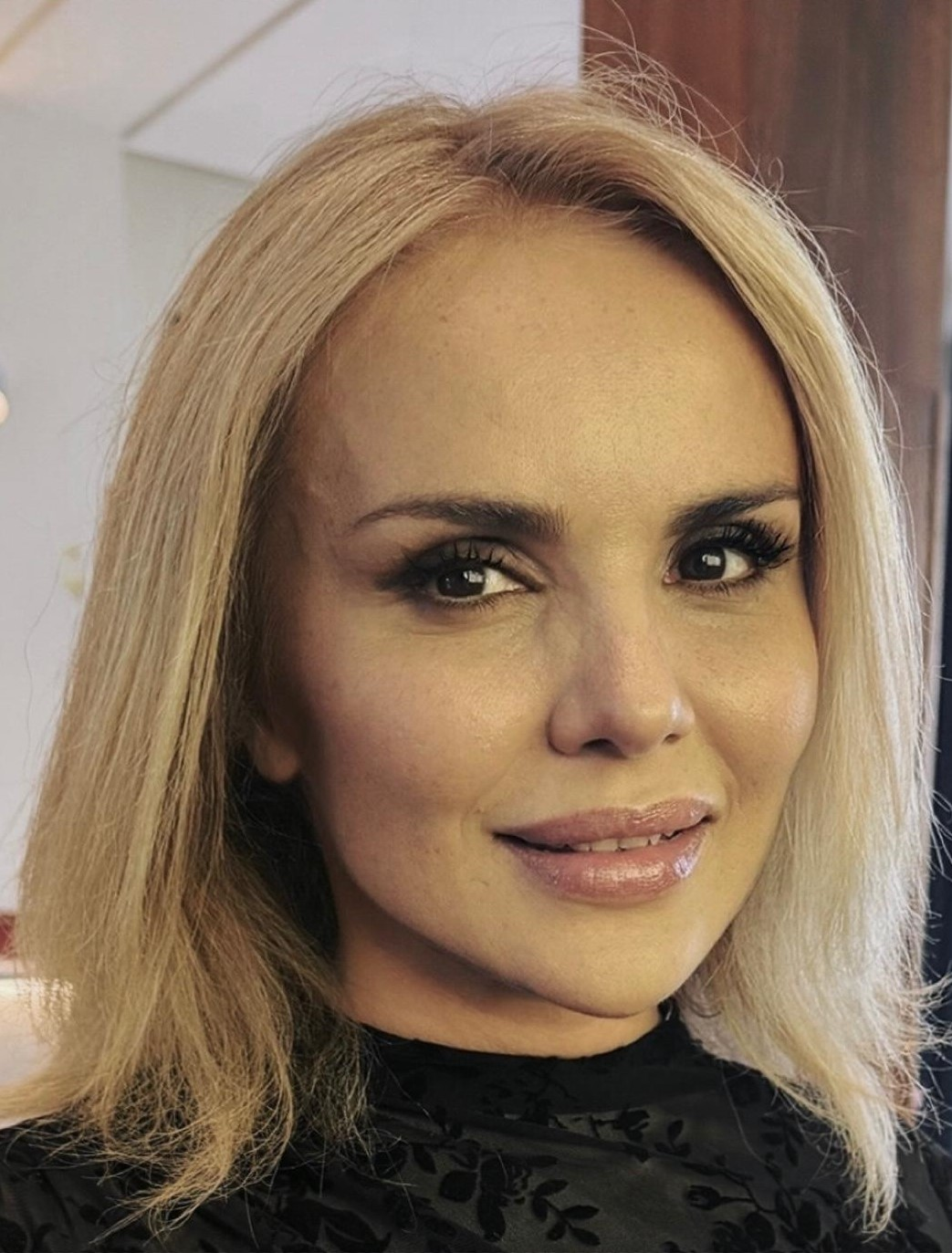
- Ilaria Borrelli in 2026
- Born: 9 June 1968 (age 58); Naples, Italy
- Occupations: Film director; screenwriter; Actress; Producer
- Years active: 1988 —present
- Known for: The Goat

Ilaria Borrelli is an Italian actress, scriptwriter, director, and producer., known for The Goat.

== Biography ==
Ilaria Borrelli was born in Naples, Italy, in 1968. She studied piano at the Conservatorio Santa Cecilia in Rome and graduated in 1987. She is a writer, actress, scriptwriter, director, and producer. She has performed in movies, plays, and in French and Italian TV series. Between 1999 and 2007, Borrelli published four novels, Scosse, Luccattmì, Domani si Gira, and Tanto Rumore per Tullia, for which she received critical acclaim and several prestigious literary prizes.

Borrelli’s work in her books is representative of an “Italian-style” postfeminist paradigm. It is an aggressive attack on the patriarchal manipulation of women’s sense of inadequacy and their lack of confidence spanning generations..

Borrelli's postfeminist ideas are reflected in her first two comedies. The setting of Borrelli’s first feature film, Mariti in Affitto (2004), moves from Procida, a small Italian island near Naples, to New York. The postfeminist paradigm here is clearly in motion: the subaltern male characters, female friendship, and the collaborative effort of the two women to gain independence and control of their lives.

Similarly, in her second feature film, Come le formiche, the two sisters’ reconciliation allows to save the winery they manage instead of their incompetent husbands.

=== Social commitment ===
Talking To The Trees (Retour à La Vie in the French version) is set in Cambodia where Mia (Ilaria Borrelli herself) wants to save Srey, a little girl from a brothel where she has seen her having sex with her husband. The movie shows her « passionate commitment » to raise awareness to combat child prostitution.

As for The Goat (2023), it is a rare, if not unique, case of an Arab production directed by an Italian woman. An 11-year-old pregnant orphan named Hadya has been forced into marriage and becomes the target of a western corporation that seeks to control the only water source in her village. She escapes into the desert with her goat on a journey in search of her father. Borrelli explained that this film aims to question « civilised » western countries – and all of us who live in them – about our role in the appropriation of the natural resources of poorer countries. In April 2026, The goat was screened at the Filmothèque du Quartier latin (fr), a movie theater in Paris. The exceptional nature of this event - organized as part of the World Art Day International Forum, a UNESCO event organized by Guila-Clara Kessous, UNESCO Artist for Peace, an annual international debate aimed at exploring the catalytic role of art in social transformation - was underscored by the participation of Dr. Denis Mukwege, winner of the 2018 Nobel Peace Prize.

== Private life ==
Ilaria Borreli was born in Naples, studied in Rome, lived for 9 years in New-York where she studied at NYU and settled in Paris about 2009. She was married to Guido Freddi, filmmaker and musician, with whom she has two children.

== Novels ==
Year	Original Title	Editor	English title	English language editor (year)	Literary prize (year)
1999	Scosse	Vittorio Pronti	Tremblings	Classi (2015)	Club Letterario Italiano (2000); Premio Firenze (2000); Premio Prevert (2000)
2002	Luccattmi	Avagliano	NA		
2003	Domani si Gira	Avagliano	NA		Il Viaggio Infinito (2003); Marengo d'Oro (2003)
2005	Tanto Rumore per Tullia	Sperling & Kupfer	NA		

== Filmography ==
Year	Film - Italian or French language title English language title	Actress	Director	Writer	Producer
1990	Il sole anche di notte	Yes	No	No	No
1991	Cena alle nove	Yes	No	No	No
1993	The Washing Machine	Yes	No	No	No
1993	La cavalière TV series	Yes	No	No	No
1993	Polly West est de retour TV movie	Yes	No	No	No
1994	I pavoni	Yes	No	No	No
1996	Frankfurt-Miami; Tatort series episode 14	Yes	No	No	No
1994-1997	La mondaine TV series	Yes	No	No	No
1997	La vita è bella Life is beautiful	Yes dubbing Nicoletta Braschi in the American version	No	No	No
2004	Mariti in Affitto; Our Italian Husband starring Chevy Chase and Brooke Shields	No	Yes	Yes	No
2007	Come le formiche Wine and Kisses starring F. Murray Abraham and Bernadette Peters	No	Yes	Yes	No
2008	L'uomo con la valigia TV movie	Yes	No	No	No
2012	Frozen Souls (short film)	Yes	Yes	Yes	No
2012	Talking to the trees also known as The Girl From The Brothel or in French Retour à la vie or in Italian Parla con gli alberi	Yes	Yes	Yes	Yes coproducer
2023	The Goat starring Mira Scorvino and John Savage	No	Yes	Yes	Yes; Co-producer, Executive Producer

== Awards ==
- 2019 - Critics' award and Golden Rose of the Canova Club in Rome
- 2023 - LA Independent Women Film Awards : The Goat - Best narrative
