= Portrait of a Serial Monogamist =

- Directed by: John Mitchell; Christina Zeidler
- Written by: John Mitchell; Christina Zeidler
- Produced by: Mehernaz Lentin; Christina Zeidler
- Starring: Diane Flacks; Carolyn Taylor; Vanessa Dunn
- Cinematography: Celiana Cárdenas
- Edited by: Terrance Odette
- Music by: Don Pyle
- Release date: June 20, 2015
- Running time: 84 minutes
- Country: Canada
- Language: English

Portrait of a Serial Monogamist is a Canadian romantic comedy film, which premiered on the LGBT film festival circuit in 2015 before going into general theatrical release in 2016.

Written and directed by John Mitchell and Christina Zeidler, the film stars Diane Flacks as Elsie Neufeld, a lesbian who breaks up with her latest girlfriend Robyn (Carolyn Taylor) and accepts a dare from her friends to stay single for five months instead of rushing into a new relationship. However, she finds her resolve tested by the arrival of new love interest Lolli (Vanessa Dunn), as well as the nagging suspicion that breaking up with Robyn may have been a mistake.

The film's cast also includes Gavin Crawford, Sabrina Jalees, Grace Lynn Kung, Raoul Bhaneja, Robin Duke, Aurora Browne and Elvira Kurt.
