= The Curse of the Snail =

2020 book

- Author: Philippe Caroit
- Language: French
- Publisher: Anne Carrière
- Publication date: November 2020
- Publication place: France
- Pages: 192
- ISBN: 978-2-84337-993-2

The Curse of the Snail (French: La malédiction de l'escargot) is a novel written by Philippe Caroit and published in 2020 by the Anne Carrière publishing house. It is the author's debut novel, who is a renowned French actor and painter.

== Plot ==
Hugo Talmont is a popular actor who has just been left by Olivia, his partner, as he has refused to give her the child, due to his support of degrowth, and a desire to not take part in demographic explosion for enviornmental reasons. He also is oppositional to having a child due having been abandoned by his father, who is spending his final days in an elderly care home near Paris. Hugo only feels at ease on stage or when he’s jogging.

One evening, a culturally goth-punk teenager named Candice comes to see him at the theater, claiming to be his daughter.

== Main characters ==
Hugo Talmont: A popular actor who has just been left by his partner, Olivia. He is marked by his past as an abandoned child and refuses to have children, adopting an antinatalist view due to his ecological beliefs. His life takes an unexpected turn when he discovers that he is the father of a teenager, Candice, whom he has never heard of before.

Candice: A teenager who claims to be Hugo’s daughter. She provides him with DNA evidence, thereby disrupting his existence. Her captivating personality and desire to establish a relationship with Hugo add an extra layer of complexity to the plot.

Olivia: Hugo's former partner, who left him due to his ecological beliefs and refusal to have children.

== Editions ==
The pocket edition of the book was published by the Bonneton publishing house in June 2023.
