= The Best Kind of People =

2016 novel by Zoe Whittall

First edition (publ. House of Anansi)

The Best Kind of People is a 2016 novel by Canadian author Zoe Whittall. The Best Kind of People is Whittall's third novel, and it was a finalist for the Scotiabank Giller Prize, as well as named Indigo's #1 Book of 2016 and Heather's Pick. The novel was named one of the best books of the year by The Globe & Mail, The National Post, Toronto Life, and Walrus Magazine. The Best Kind of People was published by House of Anansi. Currently, the book is in the process of being adapted for film by Canadian director, Sarah Polley.

The novel follows a WASP family living in Connecticut whose lives come apart when the patriarch of the family is arrested for sexually abusing some of his students on his daughter's 17th birthday.
