= Metin Arditi =

Swiss writer

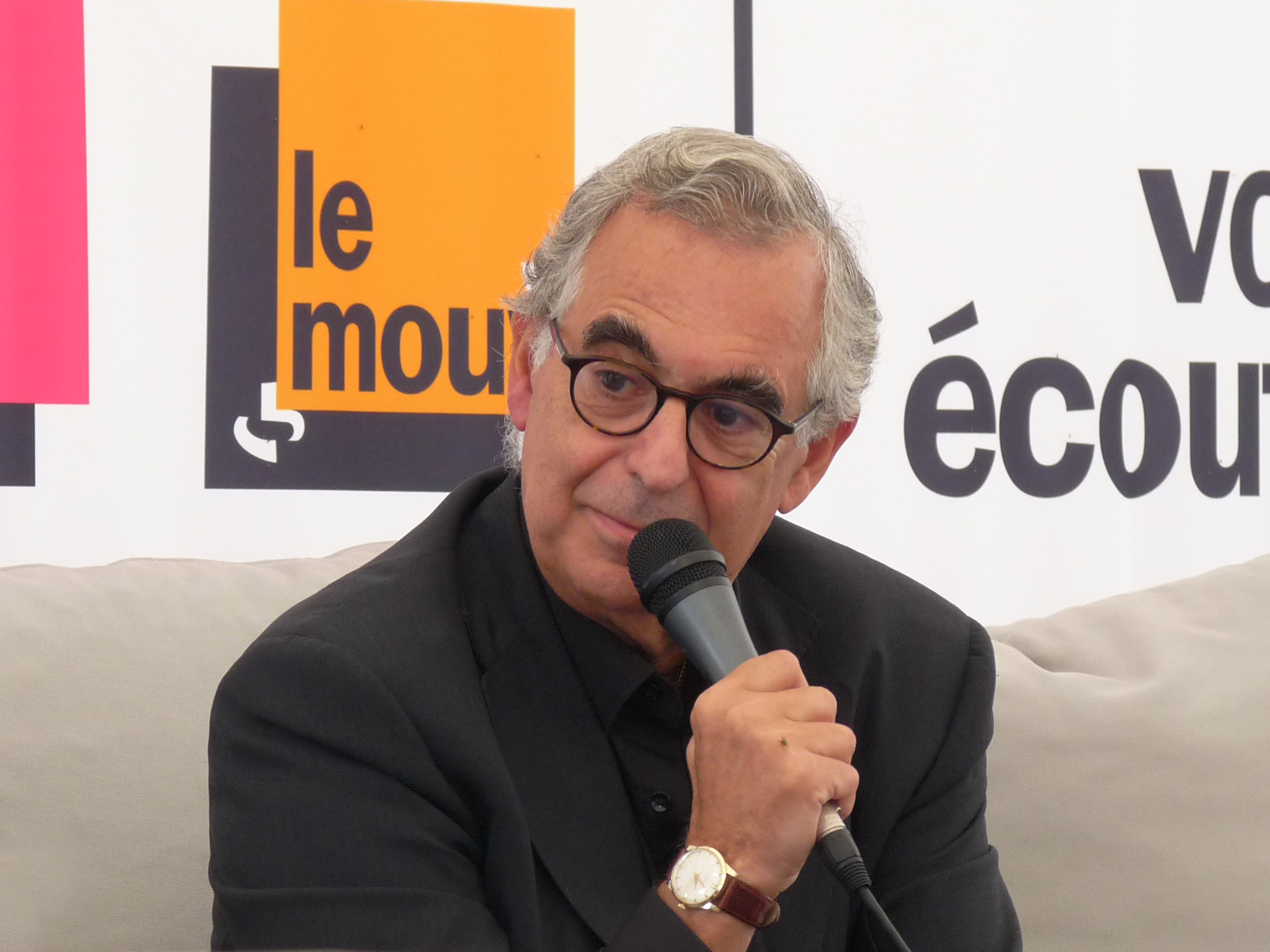
- Metin Arditi (Le Livre sur la Place, Nancy, 2011)
- Born: 2 February 1945 (age 81); Ankara
- Education: Ecole Polytechnique Fédérale de Lausanne

Metin Arditi, born 2 February 1945 in Ankara, is a French-speaking Swiss writer of Turkish Sephardi origin.

== Biography ==
Metin Arditi left Turkey at the age of seven. After spending eleven years in a Swiss boarding school in Lausanne, he studied at the EPFL (École Polytechnique Fédérale de Lausanne), where he earned a degree in physics and a postgraduate degree in nuclear engineering. He continued his studies at Stanford Business School, where he got an MBA. He lives in Geneva, where he is very involved in the cultural and artistic life of the city. From 2000 to 2013 he was Chairman of the Orchestre de la Suisse Romande (O.S.R.). He is a member of the Strategic Council of the EPFL, where over the years he taught physics (Assistant to Prof. Mercier), economics and management (as lecturer) and creative writing (as Visiting Professor). In 1988, he created the Arditi Foundation which awards fifteen annual prizes to graduates of the University of Geneva and the EPFL. The Arditi Foundation has purchased and offered to the University of Geneva a landmark theater, the Cinema Manhattan, now called Auditorium Fondation Arditi. He is the founder of " The Instruments of Peace Foundation ", which offers musical education to children of Palestine and Israel. He is a member of the Foundation Board of the Music Conservatory of Geneva. He chaired the Building Committee of the Martin Bodmer Museum in Cologny. In December 2012, Metin Arditi was appointed UNESCO Goodwill Ambassador. In June 2014, UNESCO appointed him Special Envoy for Intercultural dialogue. In September 2014, he created the Arditi Foundation for Intercultural Dialogue.

== Writing ==
Author of essays and novels, Metin Arditi is a writer of intimacy. All his books deal with the same themes : the difficulty of parenthood, loneliness and exile.

From 2016 to 2019, he wrote a weekly column for "La Croix". Since 3 February 2025, he has been writing a weekly column titled “Cavalier seul” every Monday for the Swiss daily "Le Temps".

== Works ==
- 1997: Essay: Mon Cher Jean… de la cigale à la fracture sociale, (éditions Zoé, Genève)
- 1998: Essay: La Fontaine, fabuliste infréquentable, (éditions Le Fablier, Château-Thierry)
- 1999: Essay: Le Mystère Machiavel, (éditions Zoé, Genève)
- 2000: Essay: Nietzsche ou l'insaisissable consolation, (éditions Zoé, Genève)
- 2001: Récit: Jonction, (K.G. Saur Verlag, Munich)
- 2002: Récit: La Chambre de Vincent, (éditions Zoé, Genève)
- 2004: Novel: Victoria-Hall, (Pauvert, Paris)
- 2005: Novel: Dernière lettre à Théo, (éditions Actes Sud, Arles)
- 2006: Novel: La Pension Marguerite, (éditions Actes Sud, Arles)
- 2006: Novel: L'Imprévisible, (éditions Actes Sud, Arles)
- 2007: Novel: La Fille des Louganis, (éditions Actes Sud, Arles)
- 2009: Novel: Loin des bras, (éditions Actes Sud, Arles)
- 2011: Novel: Le Turquetto, (éditions Actes Sud, Arles)
- 2012: Novel: Prince d'orchestre, (éditions Actes Sud, Arles)
- 2013: Novel: La Confrérie des moines volants, (éditions Grasset, Paris)
- 2015: Novel: Juliette dans son bain, (éditions Grasset, Paris)
- 2016: Novel: L'Enfant qui mesurait le monde, (éditions Grasset, Paris)
- 2017: Novel: Mon père sur mes épaules, (éditions Grasset, Paris)
- 2018: Novel: Carnaval noir, (éditions Grasset, Paris)
- 2020: Novel: Rachel et les siens, (éditions Grasset, Paris), 504 pages ISBN 978-2-2468-2599-9
- 2021: Novel: L'homme qui peignait les âmes, (éditions Grasset, Paris), 292 pages ISBN 978-2-246-82395-7

== Literary Awards ==
- 2004 : Prix du Premier roman de Sablet (Victoria-Hall)
- 2006 : Prix Lipp Suisse (La Pension Marguerite)
- 2006 : Prix des Auditeurs de la Radio Suisse Romande (L'Imprévisible)
- 2007 : Prix Version Femina- Virgin Megastore. Prix de l'Office Central des Bibliothèques, Prix Ronsard des Lycéens (La Fille des Louganis)
- 2011 : Prix Jean-Giono, Prix de l'Académie de Bretagne, Prix de l'Académie Romande, Prix des Libraires de Nancy-Le Point, Prix Paroles et Plumes, Prix Millepages, Prix Page des Libraires, Prix Culture et Bibliothèques pour tous, Prix Casanova, Prix Alberto-Benveniste, Prix Océanes (Le Turquetto)
- 2019 : Prix du Livre de l'Art de Vivre Parisien
- 2021 : Shortlist of the prix du roman métis des lecteurs
