= Mae Martin =

Canadian comedian and actor (born 1987)

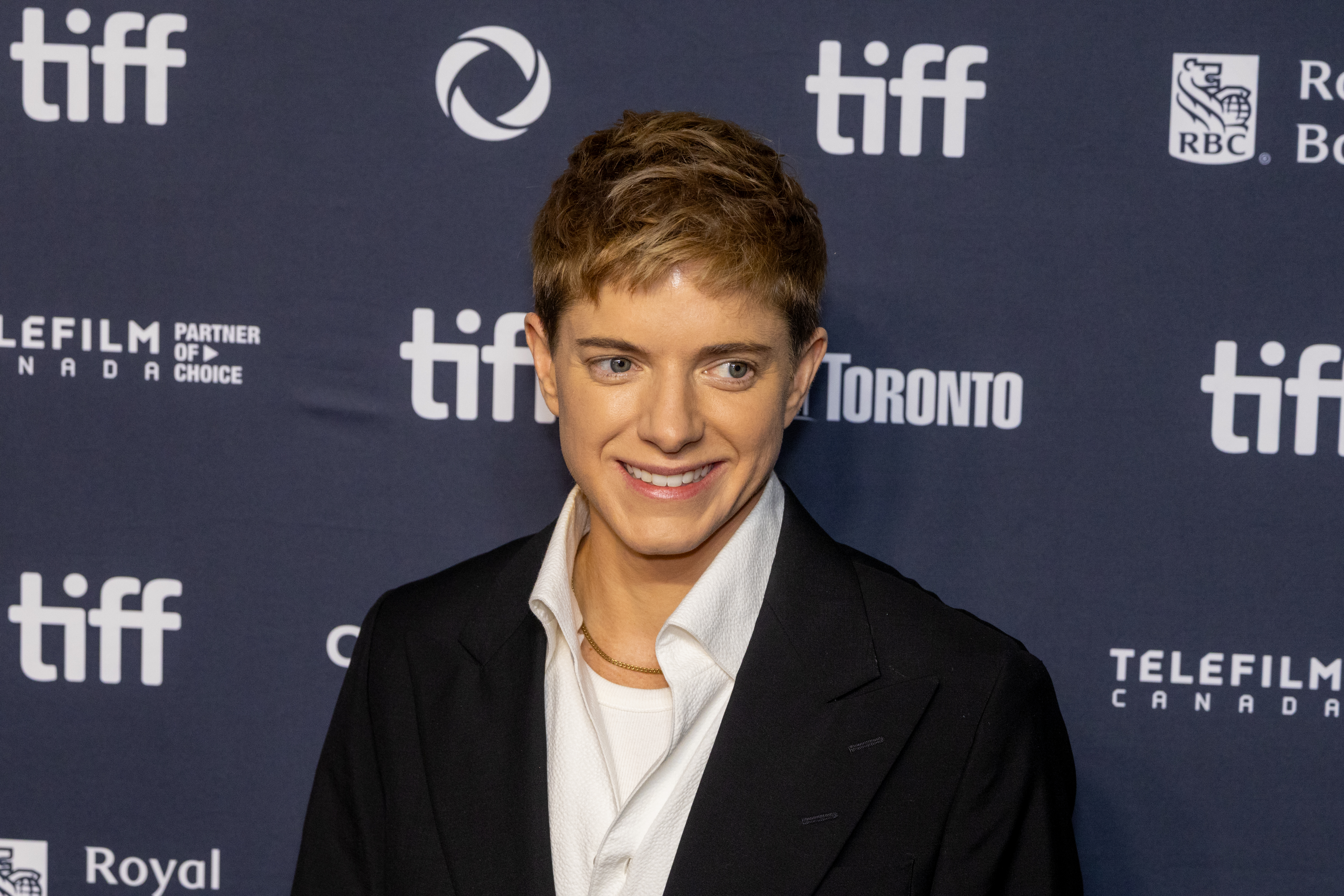
- Martin at the International Film Festival in Toronto c. 2025
- Born: Mae Pearl Martin; 2 May 1987 (age 39); Toronto, Ontario, Canada
- Occupations: Comedian; actor; screenwriter; singer-songwriter
- Partner: Parvati Shallow (2023–2024)
- Relatives: Daniel Chatto (uncle); Lady Sarah Chatto (aunt); Thomas Chatto (grandfather)
- Website: maemartin.net

Mae Pearl Martin (born 2 May 1987) is a Canadian comedian, actor, screenwriter, and recording artist. They (Note: Martin uses they/them pronouns.) co-created, co-wrote, and starred in the Channel 4/Netflix comedy series Feel Good. They received a nomination for the BAFTA TV Award for Best Female Comedy Performance for their work on the series.

== Early life ==
Martin was born in Toronto, the child of Canadian writer and teacher Wendy Martin and English actor and musician-turned-food-writer James Chatto. They were baptized in a village on the Greek island of Corfu, where their family lived for several years. James and Wendy were ex-hippies and comedy fans. The family home was filled with recordings of British and American comedy classics.

Martin has described childhood obsessions with Bette Midler, The Kids in the Hall, Pee-wee Herman and The Rocky Horror Show (their grandfather, Tom Chatto, starred as narrator in the Rocky Horror stage version). Martin now points to these obsessions as early signs of an addictive personality. At 11 years old, they were taken to a comedy club and became interested in stand-up. Martin and two friends became known as "the Groupies" for going to see the Second City play Family Circus Maximus 160 times in a year.

Martin began booking gigs as part of the comedy troupe The Young and the Useless at age 13. At age 14, they started drinking and using illicit drugs. At age 15, they dropped out of the all-girls school they attended in Toronto to pursue comedy full-time while working at the Second City comedy club. When Martin was 16 and addicted to drugs, their parents kicked them out of their house, and Martin stayed with comedian friends throughout their 20s and 30s. Abusive relationships were normalised in the scene: Martin has said, "if you put a teenage girl in any industry like that, there's going to be people taking advantage". They eventually went to drug rehabilitation.

== Career ==
Martin's career started in Canada at age 13, as part of the three-person comedy troupe The Young and the Useless. They worked at The Second City comedy club, both in the box office and as a stand-up comedian.

At the age of 16, Martin was the youngest-ever nominee for the Tim Sims Encouragement Fund Award. Their work in Canada includes writing for the sketch comedy series Baroness von Sketch Show, for which they are a two-time Canadian Screen Award winner for Best Writing in a Variety or Sketch Comedy Series.

In 2011, Martin moved to London to enter the British comedy scene. Their 2015 Edinburgh Fringe Festival show, titled Mae Martin: Us, led to the BBC Radio 4 series Mae Martin's Guide to 21st Century Sexuality. They have appeared on the British television and radio programme The Now Show, and have co-hosted GrownUpLand.

In 2017, Martin debuted Dope, a show about addiction, in Edinburgh, which was shortlisted for the Edinburgh Comedy Awards. The title refers to both recreational drugs and dopamine, the brain chemical associated with compulsive behaviour, and drew on the work of Gabor Maté, among others. Dope was modified into a half-hour Netflix comedy special, released in January 2019 as part of the Comedians of the World collection.

In 2019, they released the YA book Can Everyone Please Calm Down? A Guide to 21st Century Sexuality.

Martin co-created, wrote, and starred in the 2020 Channel 4 comedy series Feel Good alongside longtime collaborator Joe Hampson. The second season was released in 2021. The show tackles relationships, queerness, addiction, and privilege. Lucy Mangan of The Guardian called the series "immaculately written" and "properly funny".

In 2022, Martin appeared in LOL: Last One Laughing Canada. Later that year, they appeared in the HBO Max series The Flight Attendant in a recurring role as Grace St. James.

In 2023, they won series 15 of the Channel 4 comedy game show Taskmaster. In August 2023, they debuted alongside comedians Fortune Feimster and Tig Notaro on the Handsome Podcast. Also in 2023, Martin starred in the comedy documentary television series I Have Nothing, for which they won Best Guest Performance in a Comedy Series at the 2024 Canadian Screen Awards.

They released the Netflix comedy special SAP in 2023. It received a Juno Award nomination for Comedy Album of the Year at the Juno Awards of 2024.

In 2024, they hosted an episode of CBC's The Nature of Things (in association with Kensington Communications and Gay Agenda) called "Fluid: Life Beyond the Binary". In the one-hour documentary, Martin explores the science behind sexual and gender fluidity, speaking with gender non-conforming youth and experts.

Production began in 2024 on their television series Wayward for Netflix. The series aired in September 2025. Martin created the series, writing and producing it. They star as Alex, a small-town cop who helps two teens investigate the secrets of their town and the boarding school they are forced to attend.

Their debut studio album, I'm a TV, was released on 27 February 2025 through Universal Music Canada, with its sound described as indie rock. The songs were all self-written, with production by Jason Couse and Wes Marskell of the Darcys. Martin performed lead vocals on the album, as well as playing piano, guitar, harmonica, and bass. They later said that many of their musical influences are Canadian indie bands that are included in the soundtrack for Wayward.

In January 2026, it was announced that they would host the 2026 Juno Awards ceremony in Hamilton, Ontario, with Martin saying of their opportunity to host: "Hopefully my immense gratitude and love will come through without also bringing us down by reminding everyone of the hellscape that the world is right now". Most recently, they had signed a deal with Netflix.

== Personal life ==
Martin has one older brother. Their grandfather was actor Tom Chatto. Their paternal uncle is artist and actor Daniel Chatto, who is married to Lady Sarah Chatto, a cousin of King Charles III.

In 2021, Martin called themself "a queer person", came out as non-binary, began using they/them pronouns, and had top surgery. They have dated both men and women, saying that they are bisexual after previously resisting labelling their sexuality.

In December 2023, they were in a relationship with reality television personality Parvati Shallow, best known for competing on multiple seasons of Survivor. Shallow told People magazine in January 2025 that their relationship was in "an in-flux situation."

In a 2024 interview with Adam Grant, Martin discussed their ADHD diagnosis and their experience with the disorder.

== Filmography ==
=== Film ===
Film
Year	Title	Role	Notes
2001	Bagatelle	Grace	Short film
2025	Zootopia 2	Tuffy Cheeksworth	Voice role

=== Television ===
Television
Year	Title	Role	Notes
2003	Cream of Comedy	—N/a	TV special; writer only
2012	Upstaged	Mae	Television short
2014	Sketch My Life	—N/a	Writer only
2016–2019	Baroness von Sketch Show	Employee	Episode: "It Satisfies on a Very Basic Level"; also writer/story editor – 29 episodes
2017	Uncle	Imogen	2 episodes
2018	Jon Richardson: Ultimate Worrier	Themself	4 episodes; writer on episode: "Jon Richardson"
2019	Comedians of the World	Themself	Episode: "Mae Martin"; also writer and producer
2020–2021	Feel Good	Mae	12 episodes; also creator and writer – 6 episodes
2021	Richard Osman's House of Games	Contestant	5 episodes
2022	LOL: Last One Laughing	Contestant	Canadian version
2022	The Flight Attendant	Grace St. James	7 episodes
2022	Stand Out: An LGBTQ+ Celebration	Themself	Netflix documentary
2023	Taskmaster	Contestant	Season 15, Champion of Champions III (cameo in intro)
2023	I Have Nothing	Themself	6 episodes; Won Best Guest Performance in a Comedy Series at the 12th Canadian Screen Awards
2024	John Mulaney Presents: Everybody's in LA	Themself	Episode: "PALM TREES"
2025	Wayward	Alex Dempsey	8 episodes; also creator and writer
2026-	The Hawk	Rainy	2 episodes

=== Comedy specials ===
Comedy specials
Year	Title	Distributor	Notes
2023	Mae Martin: SAP	Netflix	Netflix Comedy Special

== Discography ==
=== Studio albums ===
Title	Details
I'm a TV	Release date: 27 February 2025; Label: Try Me, Universal Music Canada; Format: LP, CD, cassette, digital download, streaming

=== Singles ===
==== As lead artist ====
Title	Year	Album
"Going Places" (Charles Watson with Mae Martin)	2022	Going Places (Note: Going Places is the name of a two-song single with the B-side featuring a version of the song without Martin.)
"Love Is Pain" (Carolyn Taylor with Mae Martin)	2023	Non-album single
"Good Dream" / "Stowaway"	2025	I'm a TV
