= Can Everyone Please Calm Down? =

2019 young adult literature book

Can Everyone Please Calm Down? A Guide to 21st Century Sexuality
- Author: Mae Martin
- Language: English
- Subject: Human sexuality
- Genre: Non-fiction
- Published: May 2019
- Publisher: Hachette Children's
- Publication place: United Kingdom

Can Everyone Please Calm Down? A Guide to 21st Century Sexuality is a 2019 young adult literature and debut book written by comedian Mae Martin.

== Overview ==
Author Mae Martin's insights into 21st century sexuality and their own, sometimes humiliating, adventures in courtship, sex and identity.

== Origins ==
In a 2019 BBC interview Martin explains, ""I wanted to write a book that I would have found helpful when I was 14 and approach the subject of sexuality, which these days can seem so fraught and serious and weighed down in debate, with humour and a lighter touch.""

In the same interview Martin described human sexuality as fluid and a spectrum, using examples of Classical Chinese and Roman civilization as well as celebrities such as musician Miley Cyrus and actor Marlon Brando that rejected definition of their sexuality.

== Media ==
The BBC said, "With her characteristically jaunty and self-depreciating style, Martin uses a blend of personal anecdotes, embarrassing teen stories and social commentary to show young people it's OK to be attracted to whoever they want."

When asked what they would change about the book, in a 2022 interview with GQ, Martin stated: 'I'm non-binary and my feelings about my own gender have evolved since I wrote it. So I’d probably delve into that a little more.' Martin also reflected they would 'probably have refrained from using my high school crush’s full name because I think it freaked her out.'

DIVA magazine wrote, "With a string of acclaimed stand-up hours under her belt, a Radio 4 series, non-fiction book Can Everyone Please Calm Down? A Guide To 21st Century Sexuality and now her very own sitcom, it really feels like Mae’s time to shine."
