= The Washing Machine =

- Directed by: Ruggero Deodato
- Screenplay by: Luigi Spagnol
- Story by: Luigi Spagnol
- Produced by: Corrado Canzio; Alessandro Canzio
- Starring: Philippe Caroit; Ilaria Borrelli; Katarzyna Figura
- Cinematography: Sergio D'Offizi
- Edited by: Gianfranco Amicucci
- Music by: Claudio Simonetti
- Production companies: Esse Cinematografica; Eurogroup Film; Focus Film
- Release date: 1993
- Running time: 90 minutes
- Countries: Italy; France; Hungary

The Washing Machine (Italian: Vortice Mortale) is a 1993 giallo film directed by Ruggero Deodato.

== Plot ==
Three eccentric sisters, the Kolbas, live together in the same penthouse: Vida, the spoiled temptress, Ludmilla, the lonely voyeur, and Maria, the bisexual sister who owns a black cat. Vida broke up with her boyfriend, mob boss Yuri Petkov, after finding he engraved a bracelet with Maria's nickname "Sissy". Late at night, Ludmilla sees the washing machine running, with blood pouring out the door. When it opens, Yuri is seen dead and dismembered inside it. Ludmilla is knocked out as she tries to run and hits her head, and by the time the police are called, Yuri's remains are gone.

Inspector Alexander Stacev is assigned to the case. He tells the sisters there is no case, putting it down to a drunken hallucination. Without revealing how she got his number, Ludmilla calls Stacev's house while he's with his girlfriend, lawyer Irina. Stacev agrees to meet her about the case, but Vida corners him, aggressively seducing him while saying Ludmilla was jealous, which is why Vida and Yuri made sure she was watching them have sex. Stacev rebuffs Vida, but by the time he's to meet Ludmilla, she's scared off by his colleague, Nikolai. Nikolai later tells Stacev the files of Petkov's criminal record are missing.

The sisters follow Stacev around to mess with him, or manipulate him when he is questioning them. Ludmilla gives love letters from Yuri to Maria, but Maria says she and her blind girlfriend Nidaya teased Yuri to string him along. Vida, at Yuri's strip club, explicitly tells Stacev the letters aren't in Yuri's handwriting, giving Stacev a letter she says actually is. After Vida convinces Stacev to break into Yuri's apartment with her, she cuffs him to a stairwell and rapes him. Nikolai makes the rookie mistake of not telling their superiors Stacev's fingerprints were at the scene, so Stacev lambasts him for it.

The sisters keep changing their stories or avoid Stacev completely when he was questions. Maria says she saw her cat eat Yuri's hand on a plate. Ludmilla says she's a clairvoyant and says she saw Yuri's murder in a dream before it happened. Vida reveals Ludmilla's husband fell into a canal and drowned, but she was officially cleared despite being the only witness. Maria succeeds in seducing Stacev, especially during a seminar she and her girlfriend hold for blind students, making out with Stacev while playing with how Nidaya can't see them.

Stacev's relationship with Irina becomes strained, and when she realizes the Kolbas are seducing Stacev, he angrily admits it and rejects her. She kills herself without him, but he throws her to floor, and while he takes a shower, Irina shoots herself with his service pistol he left out by mistake. At headquarters, Nikolai shows two German career criminals they recently arrested. Yuri conned them in a business deal with counterfeit payment, but the two Germans confirmed they saw Yuri arrive at the house outside of the time frame the sisters accounted for with the murder, meaning they're all lying. Ludmila and Marila both give false confessions: Ludmila had sex with Yuri on the washing machine, then he was electrocuted by a loose wire; Maria walked in on them having sex, offered herself, and stabbed Yuri. All the while, Stacev's tea was drugged. He has horrid dreams where he sees visions of Vida hacking up Yuri's remains with a cleaver, while the sisters laugh. When the drugs wear off and he wakes up, Vida shows him out, implying she killed Yuri, but then saying she may also be lying.

Stacev finds out a suitcase of jewels and cash were meant for the sisters, and when he discovers it, he keeps it at his apartment until he can gather evidence of Yuri's murder. Maria meets Stacev at the conservatory where she and Ludmilla perform, and she shows him photos of him with all three sisters. She blackmails him with ruining his career, while simultaneously saying she loves him and wants to run off with him and the riches. Stacey doesn't consider her being honest, but after a bit of sex, he changes his mind and accepts them leaving together.

But all the while, someone burgled Stacev's apartment for the suitcase, later revealed to be Nikolai. Before he can properly make use of the riches, an unseen killer chokes him to death. When Maria does not get the call she needs from Stacev so she can leave, she realizes why not: his dead, dismembered remains are in the washing machine. Ludmilla and Vida show themselves with the jewels. The killer of Nikolai and Stacev is revealed to be a very much alive Yuri. Nidaya also appears, having told the group of Maria's meeting out of wanting Maria to stay with her. Yuri threatens to kill Maria if she doesn't agree to be a part of the family, and as insurance, the five take a group photo with Stacev still in the washer. But shortly thereafter, to avenge herself and Stacev, Maris throws an iron into Yuri's running bath and electrocuted him to death. The ladies surround Maria while she gloats, and they all start to laugh.

== Cast ==
- Philippe Caroit as Inspector Alexander Stacev
- Ilaria Borrelli as Maria "Sissy" Kolba
- Katarzyna Figura as Vida Kolba
- Barbara Ricci as Ludmilla Kolba
- Laurence Regnier as Nikolai
- László Borbély as Music Teacher
- Claudia Pozzi as Irina
- Yorgo Voyagis as Yuri Petkov
- Vilmos Kolba as Blind School Instructor
- Károly Medriczky as German Tourist #1
- Sándor Boros as German Tourist #2
- Tamás Pintér as Male Orchestra Singer
- Ágnes Dávid as Female Orchestra Singer

== Production ==
The Washing Machine was based on a stage play La Lavatrice by Luigi Spagnol. It was shot in Budapest. Deodato described the film as being "made precariously" and without distribution.

== Release ==
The Washing Machine was released in 1993 and did not find distribution in Italy. The film was released on home video in the Netherlands as The Washing Machine. The Washing Machine was released in 2014 on DVD in the UK by Shameless Screen Entertainment.

== Reception ==
From retrospective reviews, Adrian Luther Smith in his book on Italian giallo found the film to be "one of [Deodato]'s better films" and that Claudio Simonetti's score was "one of the best in recent years."

Deodato gave different reactions to the film on different occasions. In one interview he stated he wasn't happy with the film as the casting was wrong and that the film "was made too quickly… I can only say that I am not at all pleased with the final result because it's a very intimate movie and should have had well-known actors, which it does not. So, after the first few minutes it collapses." In another interview, Deodato described the film as "interesting" and that it was an "erotic-giallo, with a horror tinge to it" and having a Rashomon-theme throughout with characters having different points of view.
