= Meredith MacNeill =

Canadian writer and actor (born 1975)

- Born: 19 June 1975 (age 51); Amherst, Nova Scotia
- Education: Royal Academy of Dramatic Art
- Occupations: Actor, comedian
- Children: 1

Meredith MacNeill (born 1975) is a Canadian actress and comedian. She has appeared in both Canadian and British productions, notably starring in the BBC sketch show Man Stroke Woman (2005–07) and the comedy films Confetti (2006) and Frequently Asked Questions About Time Travel (2009). She co-created, produced and starred in the CBC sketch show Baroness von Sketch Show (2016–2021), winning eight Canadian Screen Awards and one Canadian Comedy Awards. MacNeill later starred as Det. Sam Wazowski in the CBC police comedy-drama series, Pretty Hard Cases (2021–2023), for which she was nominated for four Canadian Screen Awards.

== Career ==
MacNeill began her career appearing in British television and film. She made her debut guest-starring in an episode of crime drama The Vice and later that year had a minor role in the comedy film, Blackball. In 2005, MacNeill appeared in series 3, episode 2 of Peep Show, playing the character of Mark and Jez's old friend from university, "Canadian" Merry. She promises Jez and Super Hans the disused pub she owns, and has a manic episode shortly afterwards. From 2005 to 2007 she starred in the BBC sketch show Man Stroke Woman. She appears in the 2009 film Frequently Asked Questions About Time Travel as a time traveller called Millie. In 2009 she also appeared in production of Mary Stuart which played at the Traverse Theatre in Edinburgh and Linz in Austria.

In 2010s, MacNeill, after becoming a newly single mother, returned to Canada and began writing screenplays. After writing episodes of This Hour Has 22 Minutes, MacNeill starred in the films Big News from Grand Rock (2014), North Mountain (2015), and Your Money or Your Wife (2015). She was awarded best actress at the 2015 Atlantic Film Festival for her role in Your Money or Your Wife. In 2016 she co-created and went to star in the CBC Television comedy series Baroness von Sketch Show, At the 5th Canadian Screen Awards in 2017, MacNeill and her Baroness von Sketch Show castmates Aurora Browne, Carolyn Taylor and Jennifer Whalen were nominated for Best Ensemble Performance in a Variety or Sketch Comedy Series, and won the award for Best Writing in a Variety or Sketch Comedy Series; at the 6th Canadian Screen Awards in 2018, the troupe won the awards in both of the same categories.

In 2021 MacNeill was cast as a police detective Sam Wazowski in the CBC comedy-drama series, Pretty Hard Cases opposite Adrienne C. Moore. The series ended in 2023.

== Personal life ==
MacNeill is originally from Amherst, Nova Scotia. She is a graduate of the Royal Academy of Dramatic Art.

== Filmography ==
=== Film ===
Year	Title	Role	Notes
2003	Blackball	Suzi	
2005	Festival	Mary	
2006	Confetti	Isabelle	
2007	The Good Night	Tica	
2007	Pass It on: Coaching Skills for Managers	Angie	Video short
2009	Frequently Asked Questions About Time Travel	Millie	
2014	Big News from Grand Rock	Lucy	
2015	North Mountain	Mona	
2015	Your Money or Your Wife	Annie	Atlantic International Film Festival for Outstanding Performance by an Actress
2026	Paw Patrol: The Dino Movie	Harper Cutless (voice)	

=== Television ===
Year	Title	Role	Notes
2003	The Vice	Tina	Season 5, episode 2: "The Gameboys"
2003	Ultimate Force	Jenny Lloyd	Season 2, episode 3: "Wannabes"
2005	Peep Show	Merry	Season 3, episode 2: "Sectioning"
2005	The Queen's Sister	Sharman Douglas	TV movie
2005	My Family and Other Animals	Silent Girlfriend	TV movie
2005-2007	Man Stroke Woman	Various	12 episodes
2011-2012	This Hour Has 22 Minutes	—N/a	Writer - 2 episodes Canadian Screen Award for Best Performance, Sketch Comedy (Individual or Ensemble)
2015	The Book of Negroes	Judith Palmer	Miniseries; Episode 5
2015	Haven	Ona Fortuna	Season 5, episode 19: "Perditus"
2016-2021	Baroness von Sketch Show	Various	46 episodes Writer; Director - 2 episodes Producer; Canadian Screen Award for Best Writing in a Variety or Sketch Comedy Program or Series (2017—2021); Canadian Screen Award for Best Performance, Sketch Comedy (Individual or Ensemble) (2018); Canadian Screen Award for Best Sketch Comedy Program or Series (2018—2019); Canadian Comedy Award for Best TV Show; Nominated — ACTRA Award for Outstanding Performance - Ensemble (2019); Nominated — Canadian Screen Award for Best Comedy Series (2021)
2021–2023	Pretty Hard Cases	Det. Sam Wazowski	32 episodes Nominated — Canadian Screen Award for Best Leading Performance in a Drama Series (2024); Nominated — Canadian Screen Award for Best Lead Actress, Comedy (2022); Nominated — Canadian Screen Award for Best Leading Performance in a Comedy Series (2023); Nominated — Canadian Screen Award for Best Ensemble Performance, Drama (2024)
2025-present	Small Achievable Goals	Kris	Series regular
