= Jennifer Whalen (actress) =

Canadian actor

Jennifer Whalen is a Canadian actress and comedian, best known as one of the creators and stars of the sketch comedy series Baroness von Sketch Show.

An alumna of the Toronto company of The Second City, she was a writer for This Hour Has 22 Minutes before launching Baroness von Sketch with her castmates Meredith MacNeill, Aurora Browne and Carolyn Taylor.

At the 5th Canadian Screen Awards in 2017, the troupe were nominated for Best Ensemble Performance in a Variety or Sketch Comedy Series, and won the award for Best Writing in a Variety or Sketch Comedy Series; at the 6th Canadian Screen Awards in 2018, the troupe won the awards in both of the same categories.

She has also had acting roles in the television series InSecurity and The Beaverton, and wrote for the television series The Gavin Crawford Show, SketchCom, Instant Star, The Ron James Show, InSecurity and The Dating Guy.

== Filmography ==
=== Television ===
| Year | Title | Role | Notes |
|---|---|---|---|
| 2011 | InSecurity | Dangerous mom | |
| 2016–2021 | Baroness von Sketch Show | Various | |
| 2017 | The Beaverton | Sadie Venn | |
| 2025-present | Small Achievable Goals | Julie | |
