= Carolyn Taylor =

Canadian actress and comedian

Carolyn Taylor is a Canadian actress and comedian, best known as one of the creators and stars of the sketch comedy series Baroness von Sketch Show.

An alumna of The Second City's Toronto company, she was a writer for This Hour Has 22 Minutes before launching Baroness von Sketch with her castmates Meredith MacNeill, Aurora Browne and Jennifer Whalen.

At the 5th Canadian Screen Awards in 2017, the troupe were nominated for Best Ensemble Performance in a Variety or Sketch Comedy Series, and won the award for Best Writing in a Variety or Sketch Comedy Series; at the 6th Canadian Screen Awards in 2018, the troupe won the awards in both of the same categories.

She has also had acting roles in the television series Queer as Folk, Zoe Busiek: Wild Card, Sue Thomas: F.B. Eye, Ghosts season 2, episode 4 "The Tree" as June and the films 19 Months and Portrait of a Serial Monogamist, and wrote for the television series That's So Weird! and Dan for Mayor.

Taylor created the original documentary comedy series I Have Nothing that follows Taylor on a comical quest to choreograph the perfect, pairs figure skating routine set to Whitney Houston’s 1992 hit song “I Have Nothing.” Joining Taylor on her mission are legends from the world of figure skating including Canadian choreographer Sandra Bezic, two-time Olympic gold medalist Ekaterina Gordeeva, Olympic gold medalist David Pelletier, world champions Brian Orser, Kurt Browning, Barbara Underhill and Paul Martini, as well as award-winning comedian, actor, and writer, Mae Martin. The series was released on Crave on September 23, 2023.

She is an out lesbian.

== Filmography ==
=== Film ===
Film
Year	Title	Role	Notes
2002	19 Months	Lisa	
2015	Portrait of a Serial Monogamist	Robyn Woodyard	
2017	This Will Be My Legacy	Diana	Short film
2019	The AfterLifetime of Colm Feore	Receptionist	Short film
2019	Camera Test	Interview Subject	Short film

=== Television ===
Television
Year	Title	Role	Notes
2002	The Zack Files	Security Guard	Season 2, episode 16: "Kleptomanizack"
2002	Nero Wolfe	Smelly Woman	Season 2, episode 2: "The Next Witness"
2002	Queer as Folk	Student / Grad Student	2 episodes
2002-2004	Sue Thomas: F.B.Eye	Arlene	3 episodes
2003	Wild Card	Penny	2 episodes Also known as Zoe Busiek: Wild Card
2005-2012	This Hour Has 22 Minutes	—N/a	Writer - 39 episodes
2008	Corner Gas	—N/a	Writer - 8 episodes
2009-2010	That's So Weird!	—N/a	Writer - 13 episodes
2011	Dan for Mayor	—N/a	Writer - 3 episodes
2016-2021	Baroness von Sketch Show	Various	46 episodes Director - 2 episodes Writer; Producer
2019	Cavendish	Beverly Clinch	Episode 2: "The Annes"
2019	The Great Canadian Baking Show	Co-host (with Aurora Browne)	Season 3 - 10 episodes
2021	Scaredy Cats	Wanda	9 episodes
2022	Detention Adventure	Grisel	3 episodes
2022	Workin' Moms	Kathy	Season 6, episode 10: "Bachelorette, But Make it Spooky"
2022	Ghosts	June	2 episodes
2022	Phantom Pups	Writer, episode: "Phantom Phoam"	
2023	I Have Nothing	Herself	6 episodes Writer; Executive Producer
2025	Black Mirror	Penelope	Episode 1: "Common People"
2025	Plan B	Cat	6 episodes

=== Podcast ===
Film as actress
Year	Title	Role	Notes
2019	The Zeta Family	Katie's Mom	
