= The Writers' Block =

Canadian comedy web series

The Writers' Block is a Canadian comedy web series that premiered in 2015. Created by David Benjamin Tomlinson and Matt Watts, the series begins with writer Matt (Watts) drunkenly pitching a terrible idea for a television series about a town populated with zombies; after the network executive loves the idea, however, Watts and his writing colleagues David (Tomlinson) and Aurora (Aurora Browne) struggle to figure out both how to turn the idea into a viable series and how to keep their personal lives from derailing it.

The series was launched independently in 2015. A second season premiered in 2018 on the Canadian Broadcasting Corporation's CBC Comedy web platform, and is currently available on CBC Gem.

At the 7th Canadian Screen Awards in 2019, Jayne Eastwood won the award for Best Supporting Performance in a Digital Program or Series, and Browne was nominated for Best Lead Performance in a Digital Program or Series.
