= Aurora Browne =

Canadian actress and comedian

Aurora Browne is a Canadian actress and comedian, best known as the creator and star of the sketch comedy series Baroness Von Sketch.

== Early life ==
She is originally from Thunder Bay, Ontario, and currently based in Toronto.

== Career ==
In 2000, she was nominated for the Tim Sims Encouragement Fund Award. Also in that year she was hired by Toronto's The Second City comedy troupe. While there she co-wrote and performed in four Mainstage revues: "Family Circus Maximus", "Psychedelicatessen", "Insanity Fair" and "The Bush League of Justice". She co-starred in four seasons of the CTV/Comedy Network production Comedy Inc. She made a guest appearance on the second season of Corner Gas. She won the 2008 Canadian Comedy Award for Best Female Improviser.

She co-produced and acted the role of Vampira in the Toronto Fringe Festival production of Ed Wood's classic Plan 9 from Outer Space named Plan Live! From Outer Space. "Plan Live! From Outer Space" received the 2007 Canadian Comedy Award for Best Comedic Play.

At the 5th Canadian Screen Awards in 2017, Browne and her Baroness von Sketch Show castmates Meredith MacNeill, Carolyn Taylor and Jennifer Whalen were nominated for Best Ensemble Performance in a Variety or Sketch Comedy Series, and won the award for Best Writing in a Variety or Sketch Comedy Series; at the 6th Canadian Screen Awards in 2018, the troupe won the awards in both of the same categories. At the 7th Canadian Screen Awards in 2019, the troupe again won the award for Best Writing in a Variety or Sketch Comedy Series, and Browne was nominated for Best Lead Performance in a Digital Program or Series for the webseries The Writers' Block. From 2019 to 2024, she voiced Gracie in Agent Binky: Pets of the Universe.

As of 2022, she has a recurring role in the CBC Television sitcom Run the Burbs.

== Filmography ==
=== Film ===
Year	Title	Role	Notes
2004	All You Got	Dispatcher	
2006	Plan Live from Outer Space	Tanna / Vampire Girl	
2007	Lars and the Real Girl	Lisa	
2014	RoboCop	Female Cop	
2015	Portrait of a Serial Monogamist	Girl with Poma-Dobe Dog	
2025	Mile End Kicks	Nora Pine	

=== Television ===
Year	Title	Role	Notes
2001	Leap Years	Clapper Loader	Episode #1.12
2003–2007	Comedy Inc.	Various	39 episodes
2005	Corner Gas	Dr. Chris Garner	Episode: "Doc Small"
2005	Bury the Lead	Tracy	Episode: "Das Bootcamp"
2005	Robson Arms	Carol	Episode: "The Lonely Passion of Mr Tan"
2005	Almost Entertainment	Aurora Browne	Television film
2011	Rookie Blue	Mrs. Lisa Moore	Episode: "Best Laid Plans"
2011	InSecurity	Angela Watson	Episode: "The Gift of Life"
2012	Whiskey Business	Charmaine	Television film
2012	Warehouse 13	Robin	Episode: "An Evil Within"
2012	The L.A. Complex	Saying Grace 1st AD	Episode: "Half Way"
2013	Defiance	Angry Woman	Episode: "A Well Respected Man"
2014	Odd Squad	Upset Woman	Episode: "Soundcheck/Double Trouble"
2015	Man Seeking Woman	Jessica	Episode: "Sizzurp"
2015	Newborn Moms	Rosie	15 episodes
2015–2017	The Writers' Block	Aurora	20 episodes
2016	Women Are from Mars	Captain Theresa Clarke	Episode: "Pilot"
2016	Orphan Black	Margot	Episode: "Human Raw Material"
2016–2021	Baroness von Sketch Show	Various	46 episodes
2019–present	Agent Binky: Pets of the Universe	Captain Gracie	Main role
2020	Nurses	Lydia Moon	Episode: "Incoming"
2021	Overlord and the Underwoods	Azul Azure	Episode: "3 Easy Overpayments"
2022	Run the Burbs	Barb	6 episodes
