= Sergueï Markarov =

Russian musician (born 1953)

- Born: March 31, 1953; Baku, Azerbaijan SSR, Soviet Union
- Education: Moscow Conservatory
- Genres: Classical
- Occupations: Pianist, Professor
- Instrument: Piano
- Years active: 1970s–present

Sergueï Markarov, pianist and UNESCO Artist for Peace, was born in Baku in 1953.

He studied in Leningrad and Moscow. He won the first prize for piano, teaching, chamber music and accompaniment at the Rimsky-Korsakov Conservatory in Leningrad and the 1982 Alessandro Casagrande International Piano Competition in Italy.

Since 1993, he has been performing in Europe's most prestigious concert halls and at many festivals. He is also a member of several international competition juries and teaches at the Paris Ecole Normale de musique and Conservatoire municipal Jacques Ibert de Paris.
