= Guila-Clara Kessous =

French human rights artist and academic

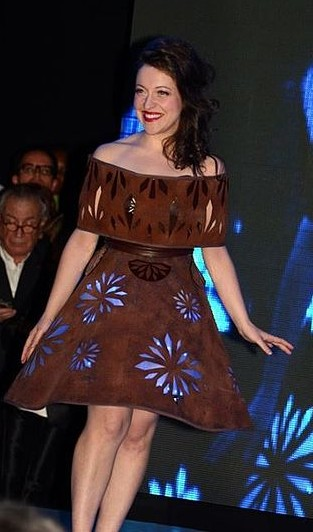

Guila Clara Kessous is a French human rights artist and academic. She was nominated UNESCO Artist for Peace for her dedication in the arts and human rights and Knight of Arts & Letters by the French Ministry of Culture for her work on the influence of French culture overseas.

== Academic work ==
Kessous has a PhD in French literature from Boston University and another in Ethics and Aesthetics, an MBA in Cultural Business and a MA in Comparative Dramaturgy, Cinema, and Pedagogy.

She created the "Theatre and Human Rights" curriculum at the Paris Institute of Political Studies (Sciences Po) and taught the program at the Carr Center of the John F. Kennedy School of Government at Harvard University. She has also taught at other institutions including Boston University, Oxford University, University of Geneva, Ecole Normale Supérieure, Alliances Françaises, Wiesel Institute and St Petersburg Conservatory.

At Harvard University, she was nominated "Fashion Ambassador" and has received two awards for teaching excellence from the Harvard's Derek Bok Center.

She is an associate researcher at the French National Centre for Scientific Research ARIAS laboratory and has a post-doctorate scholarship from the Foundation for Interreligious and Intercultural Research and Dialogue at the University of Geneva.

== Artistic work ==
She conceives drama as a socially conscious reflection pervading multiple aspects of society and culture. Her approach to theater as a cultural marker is multifaceted. She has benefited from her American and European theatrical approaches as an artist, actress, researcher, and teacher by collaborating with other directors and film makers including John Malkovich, Jim Spruill, Labid Aziz, Michael Marmarinos, Patrick Jérôme, Daniel Mesguich, Laurent Laffargue and Jean Pierre Vincent. She has co-produced and directed over 20 shows, with a specific emphasis on costumes (meeting with Jean Paul Gaultier at the Festival d'Avignon in 2006).

She had the opportunity to work with numerous artists and authors on theatrical works that primarily deal with humanitarian and social issues including Elie Wiesel, Marie NDiaye, Theodore Bikel, Marisa Berenson, James Taylor, Marie-Christine Barrault, Jean Claude Grumberg, Enzo Cormann and Jean Paul Wenzel.

Transposing analysis techniques to the cinema, she made a series of short movies presented at the Cannes Festival entitled "Private Conversation" and "Glassy Reality".
