= Our Italian Husband =

- DVD cover
- Directed by: Ilaria Borrelli
- Written by: Ilaria Borrelli
- Starring: Maria Grazia Cucinotta; Pierfrancesco Favino; Brooke Shields; Chevy Chase
- Cinematography: Paolo Ferrari
- Edited by: Colleen Sharp
- Music by: Guido Freddi
- Production companies: Coast to Coast; Cristaldi Pictures; Senza Pictures
- Distributed by: Medusa Distribuzione (theatrical); Craze Productions (video)
- Release date: 2 April 2004 (Italy)
- Running time: 108 minutes
- Country: Italy
- Language: English

Our Italian Husband (also called Rent-a-Husband or Mariti in affitto) is a 2004 romantic comedy starring Brooke Shields, Maria Grazia Cucinotta, Chevy Chase, and Pierfrancesco Favino written and directed by Ilaria Borrelli.

It's a story of an Italian woman who flies to New York City in search of her husband and discovers him married to an American wife.

== Cast ==
- Maria Grazia Cucinotta as Maria Scocozza
- Pierfrancesco Favino as Vincenzo Scocozza
- Brooke Shields as Charlene Taylor
- Chevy Chase as Paul Parmisan
- Diego Serrano as Raul
- Franco Javarone as Don Peppino
- James Falzone as Ciro Scocozza
- Lauren Martin as Lucetta Scocozza
- Jillian Stacom as Bibi Taylor
- John Tormey as Gaetano
- Jennifer Macaluso as Irina
- Ray Iannicelli as Luca
