= Yael Staav =

Yael Staav is a Canadian film and television director from Toronto, Ontario, who won the Canadian Screen Award for Best Direction in a Variety or Sketch Comedy Program or Series at the 6th Canadian Screen Awards in 2018 for her work on Baroness von Sketch Show.

She was also a nominee for Best Direction in a Comedy Series at the 11th Canadian Screen Awards in 2023 for Workin' Moms.

She previously directed the short films Sam's Formalwear and An Awesome Book of Love.
