= Stand Out: An LGBTQ+ Celebration =

- Directed by: Page Hurwitz
- Written by: Page Hurwitz
- Produced by: Page Hurwitz
- Starring: Mae Martin; Margaret Cho; Lily Tomlin; Eddie Izzard; Stephen Fry; Tig Notaro; Sandra Bernhard; Wanda Sykes; Billy Eichner
- Distributed by: Netflix
- Release date: 2022
- Country: United States
- Language: English

Stand Out: An LGBTQ+ Celebration is a 2022 stand-up comedy documentary produced by Netflix.

== Critical reception ==
Variety said in its review, "The film focuses on the importance of LGBTQ stand-up as an instrument for social progress over the past five decades, changing the world one joke at a time."

Out Front wrote, "Stand Out was a breath of fresh air for queer individuals to see so many of us on-screen celebrating the community we love and still being able to poke fun at each other."

The Hollywood Reporter wrote, "Condensed into a 90-minute variety special called Stand Out: An LGBTQ+ Celebration, released June 9, the night tackled topics from the political to casual."
