= The Darcys =

Canadian rock band

- Origin: Toronto, Ontario, Canada
- Genre: Alternative rock
- Labels: Arts & Crafts, Independent
- Members: Jason Couse; Wes Marskell
- Past members: Dave Hurlow; Mike le Riche; Kirby Best
- Website: www.thedarcys.ca

The Darcys are a Canadian two-piece art rock band from Toronto, Ontario.

Currently independent, the duo was previously signed to a four-album deal with the record label Arts & Crafts. The third of those, 2013's Warring, was nominated for a Juno Award for Alternative Album of the Year, and was a longlist nominee for the 2014 Polaris Music Prize.

== Career ==
=== 2007–2011: Formation and early work ===
The Darcys, who obtained their name from Jane Austen's Pride and Prejudice, first began as the two-piece project of Jason Couse and Wes Marskell in Etobicoke, Ontario which gradually transitioned into a full band in Halifax, Nova Scotia with the additions of Dave Hurlow and Kirby Best. In December 2007, The Darcys' debut album, Endless Water, was released. In the years following, the group returned to Toronto, and Michael le Riche was added to the lineup.

Days before their 2010 CMW showcase, Best had left the band, forcing them to frantically re-create the work of five into parts for four. This brought about the solidification of the current four-piece lineup: Jason Couse, Wes Marskell, Michael le Riche, and Dave Hurlow. On losing Best and adding Couse on vocals, Marskell notes, "We became really close friends because of it, and it also made us willing and able to work through things that came up later down the line that became publicized and were difficult for us internally." In the process of touring and recording their 2011 follow-up album amidst lineup changes, The Darcys continued to encounter hardships. This included stolen equipment, being held at knifepoint, and nearly losing their lives to a head-on collision on an icy road.

=== 2011: The Darcys (self-titled) ===
Despite the release of Endless Water, the band will argue that their "true" first release came in 2011 with their self-titled Arts & Crafts debut, which marked the first of a three-record deal with the Toronto label responsible for prominent Canadian acts such as Broken Social Scene and Feist. The 10-track release received production from Murray Lightburn of The Dears and was mixed by Dave Schiffman (Rage Against The Machine, Weezer). The album was offered as a free download on the band's website, drawing many comparisons to Radiohead for its "lushly layered, lightly proggy arrangements." A music video was released for the album's second track, "Don't Bleed Me".

=== 2012: AJA ===
Only months after releasing their self-titled album, The Darcys released their interpretation of Steely Dan's 1977 release Aja. As Marskell mentions, the choice to cover the entire album "existed solely to redirect conversation" surrounding the band's self-titled release. The release gained much criticism for recreating an album that "cannot be duplicated or reinterpreted", while also receiving praise for being "compelling" and bringing out the "dark-hued" nature of the lyrical content. On November 11, 2012, the band presented "An Interpretation Of Steely Dan's Aja" live at Toronto's historic Lee's Palace. A mini documentary was made by Adrian Vieni of Wood & Wires Productions, discussing the decision to re-imagine the album with interviews and live footage. A music video was also released for the track "Josie".

=== 2013: Warring ===
In late 2013, The Darcys delivered the third installment of a three album series with Warring. The band discussed accomplishing the album in a statement explaining: "It's learning in motion. Competition and survival, letting go to persevere. It is anxiety about the future and the triumph of life in the moment. It's victory on will alone, the force that eradicates failure as an option." The album is strongly influenced by the work of American novelist Cormac McCarthy, specifically his book Blood Meridian, which can be seen through the lyrical content. The 10-track album features artwork done by Toronto artist/graphic designer Sara Cwynar, as well as production from Tom McFall (Stars) and mixing from previous contributor, Dave Schiffman. Six music videos have been released to accompany the tracks "Pretty Girls", "Itchy Blood", "The River", "Hunting", "The Pacific Theatre", and "Horses Fell" from the album. Warring marked the band's first Juno nomination in 2014 for Alternative Album of the Year, and also earned a spot on the 2014 Polaris Music Prize longlist.

=== 2013–2014: Play In School Campaign and "Hymn For A Missing Girl" ===
The Darcys embarked on their Play in School campaign in November 2013, to support the continuation of public school music programs and engage youths in embracing the importance of the arts as a part of their development. The band was turned on to the idea when the Toronto District School Board intended to cut its musical programs, in addition to receiving countless messages from young fans who were unable to attend their mainly 19+ shows. This campaign has enabled The Darcys to visit multiple high schools across Southern Ontario with the intention of encouraging students nationwide to "hold their school boards accountable to maintain and develop music programs."

In celebration of Record Store Day, The Darcys released "Hymn for a Missing Girl" in 2014 as an epilogue to Warring. The 22-minute instrumental, split into five movements, continues the trend of its predecessor with inspiration being drawn from Cormac McCarthy's Cities of the Plain. The track was released online, though it was limited to 500 vinyl copies in North America.

The band has also released the track "Ultra Violet", a bonus track from the recording sessions of the 2013 album. In addition to working on a follow-up to Warring and touring rigorously, Marskell has been contributing to The Huffington Post by occasionally writing articles for their Canada Music section, mainly recounting The Darcys' tour experiences.

=== 2014–present: duo and Centerfold ===
On December 17, 2014, The Darcys announced the band will be going forward as a duo consisting of founding members Jason Couse and Wes Marskell.

On August 10, 2016, The Darcys announced their new album, Centerfold, would be released on November 4, 2016. The album is said to be a drastic shift in sound from the band's previous records.

The Darcys planned to release a cover of Mariah Carey's "All I Want for Christmas is You" in December 2016.

The Darcys were in the line-up for the Wayhome summer 2017 music festival in Oro-Medonte, Ontario.

The Darcys were in the line-up on the headline stage for the Wintersong 2022 music festival in Stouffville, Ontario.

== Discography ==
=== Studio albums ===
- 2011 – The Darcys
- 2012 – Aja
- 2013 – Warring
- 2016 – Centerfold
- 2020 – Fear & Loneliness
- 2024 – Rendering Feelings

=== Other releases ===
- 2014 – Hymn For A Missing Girl
- 2017 – Another Log on the Fire

=== Singles ===
- 2010 – House Built Around Your Voice 7
- 2013 – The River
- 2016 – Miracle
- 2016 – Coming Up For Air
- 2016 – Arizona Hwy
- 2018 – Just Here With My Friends (feat. Leah Fay)
- 2018 – Chasing the Fall
- 2019 – Ocean Eyes (Billie Eilish Cover)
- 2019 – Hurt
- 2019 – Hurt - Piano Version
- 2019 – Better Days
- 2019 – Melodramatic
- 2020 – Boys Don't / Change
- 2020 – Look Me in the Eyes
- 2020 – Off the Deep
