= UNESCO Artist for Peace =

Artists who help promote UNESCO's message and programs

UNESCO Artists for Peace are international celebrity advocates for the United Nations agency UNESCO. This category of advocate is intended to heighten public awareness in addition to the categories UNESCO Goodwill Ambassador and UNESCO Champion for Sport. The programme started in 1995.

== Current list ==
The following is a list of current UNESCO Artists for Peace:

Name	Country	Since	Link
Alsou Abramova	Russia	2011	
Philippine Madrigal Singers	Philippines	2009	
Franghiz Ali-Zadeh	Azerbaijan	2008	
Amri Aminov	Tajikistan	2008	
Shirley Bassey	United Kingdom	2000	
Elisso Bolkvadze	Georgia	2015	
Sarah Brightman	United Kingdom	2012	
Renaud Capuçon	France	2020	
Jane Constance	Mauritius	2017	
Earthsavers DREAMS Ensemble	Philippines	2003	
Kudsi Ergüner	Turkey	2016	
Frankétienne	Haiti	2010	
Gilberto Gil	Brazil	1999	
Valery Gergiev	Russia	2003	
The HU	Mongolia	2022	
International Choir and Philharmonic Orchestra		1999	
Sumi Jo	South Korea	2003	
Guila-Clara Kessous	France	2012	
Countess Setsuko Klossowska de Rola	Japan	2005	
Amine Kouider	Algeria	1999	
Herman Makarenko	Ukraine	2016	
Serguei Markarov	Russia	2002	
Milton Masciadri	Uruguay	1998	
Han Meilin	China	2015	
Zarifa Mgoyan	Russia	2016	
Marcus Miller	United States	2013	
N. Scott Momaday	United States	2004	
Ahlem Mosteghanemi	Algeria	2016	
Aiman Musakhodjaeva	Kazakhstan	1998	
Eijin Nimura	Japan	1998	
Ali Mahdi Nouri	Sudan	2012	
Danilo Perez	Panama	2012	
Bibi Russell	Bangladesh	2017	
Nasser Shamma	Iraq	2017	
Vladimir Spivakov	Russia	2006	
Barthélémy Toguo	Cameroon	2021	
Luigi Toscano	Germany	2021	
Gérard Voisin	France	2005	
World Orchestra for Peace	United Kingdom	2010	
