= List of refugees =

This is a list of prominent people who fled their native country, went into exile and found refuge in another country. The list follows the current legal concept of refugee only loosely. It also includes children of people who have fled. The people are ordered according to the field in which they made their names.

== Advertising ==
- Lord Maurice Saatchi and Charles Saatchi – British citizens and founders of Saatchi & Saatchi advertising agency. Their family fled persecution in Iraq for Britain in 1947.

== Architecture ==
- Eva Jiřičná – British artist and architect, designed the Faith Zone in the Millennium Dome. Born in Czechoslovakia and took refuge in the UK after the Prague Spring in 1968.
- Daniel Marot – British architect best known for Hampton Court Palace. Born in France, he sought refuge in the UK in 1685 after the revocation of the Edict of Nantes.
- Richard Rogers – British-Italian architect best known for the Centre Pompidou and the Millennium Dome. Fled Trieste in 1939 and took refuge in the UK.

== Art ==
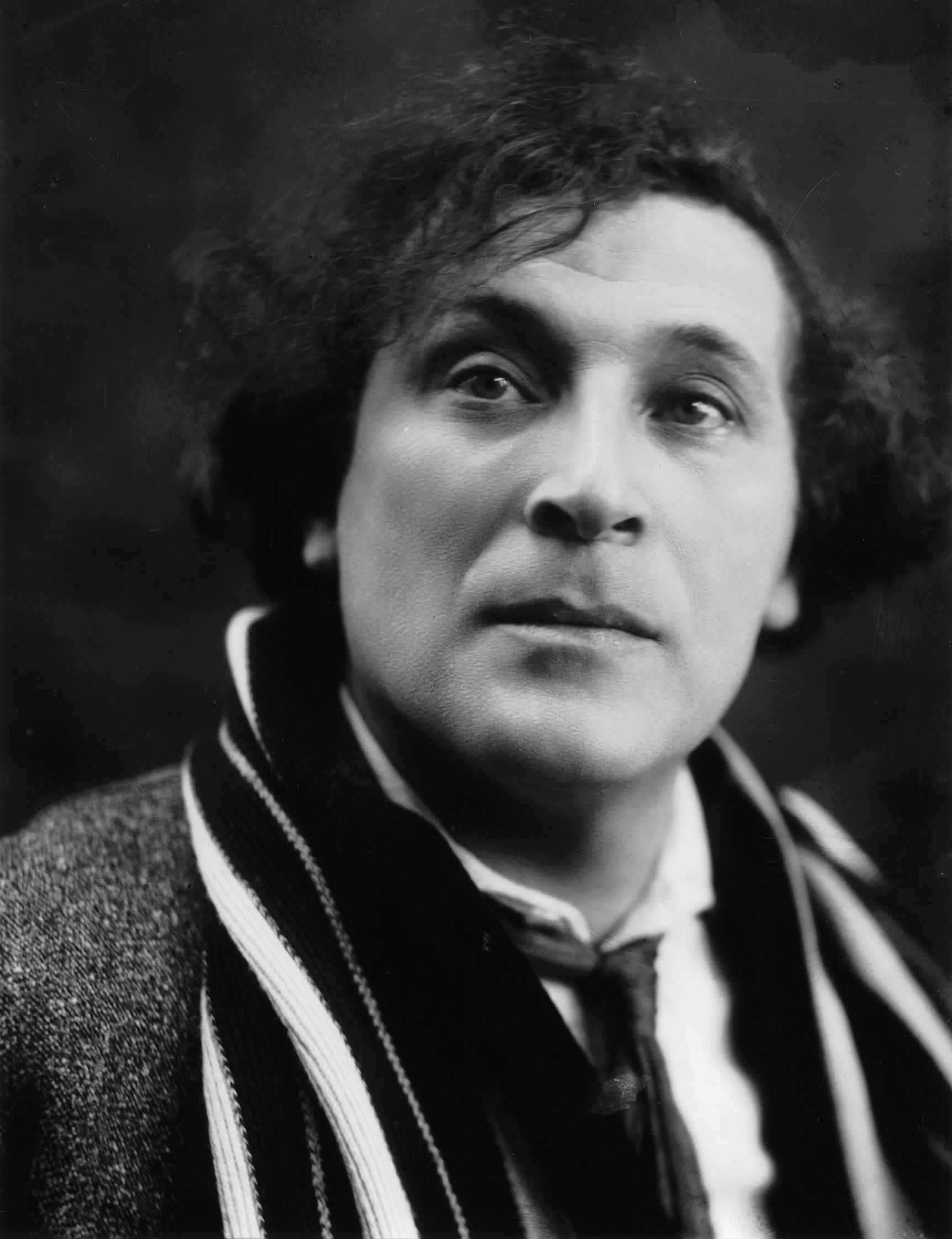
Marc Chagall

- Marc Chagall – Jewish-Russian painter. Escaped Bolshevism for asylum in France in 1922. Fled France between 1941–48 to reside in the US.
- Jacob Epstein - British modern sculptor. Child of Polish-Jewish refugees.
- Lucian Freud – British figurative painter. Born in 1922 in Germany (grandson of Sigmund Freud); came to England in 1933 as refugee from Nazism.
- Peter Carl Fabergé – Russian jeweller for Russian Imperial Court, fled Russian Revolution for Switzerland in 1917
- Mona Hatoum – British-Palestinian sculptor, performance and installation artist; Palestinian refugee born in Lebanon, forced into exile in London in 1975 when war broke out in Lebanon.
- Josine Ianco-Starrels – Los Angeles curator and museum director. Born in Romania, her family escaped to British (or Mandatory) Palestine in 1941. (see her father Marcel Janco)
- Marcel Janco – Romanian artist and architect, best known as the co-founder of Dadaism. Fled persecution in Romania for British (or Mandatory) Palestine in 1941.
- Anish Kapoor - British-Indian sculptor. His mother's family was Iraqi-Jewish and took refuge in India in 1920 after the Iraqi revolt.
- Piet Mondrian – Dutch painter, and contributor to De Stijl. World War II refugee who settled in New York City in 1940.
- Camille Pissarro – Danish-French Impressionist and Neo-Impressionist painter, took refuge in London from France during the Franco-Prussian war of 1870–1871
- Alfred Wolmark – British Post-Impressionist painter and decorative artist; Polish-Jewish refugee whose family came to the UK in 1883

== Business ==
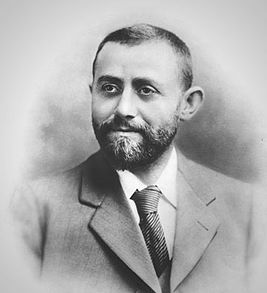
Michael Marks

- Sir Montague Burton – British citizen, founded the British clothing business Burton retail in 1903. Jewish refugee from Lithuania.
- Sir John Houblon – British citizen, first Governor of the Bank of England. Child of Huguenot refugees.
- Manubhai Madhvani – Ugandan businessman, son of Muljibhai Madhvani and head of the Madhvani Group. Expelled from Uganda by Idi Amin in 1972, returned in 1982.
- Michael Marks – British citizen, one of the founders of Marks & Spencer. He was a Polish-Jewish refugee from Belarus (then part of the Russian Empire) who fled to the UK in 1882.
- Aristotle Onassis – Greek billionaire shipping tycoon. Left Smyrna, Turkey for Greece after the Great Fire of Smyrna in the aftermath of the Greco-Turkish war.
- Thomas Peterffy - Developed electronic trading of securities. Hungarian refugee who arrived in the U.S. in 1965.
- de Portal – founder of British paper firm Portal, which for 270 years (until 1995) held the only license to print British money. Huguenot refugee who arrived in the UK in 1685.
- Sieng van Tran – British citizen, founder of the educational website www.iLearn.to. Vietnamese refugee whose family were given refuge in the UK in 1981. (see also Vietnamese Boat People)
- George Weidenfeld – British citizen; publisher, philanthropist and newspaper columnist. Jewish-Austrian refugee, fled Nazi annexation of Austria (see Anschluss) in 1938 and found refuge in the UK.

== Fashion and design ==
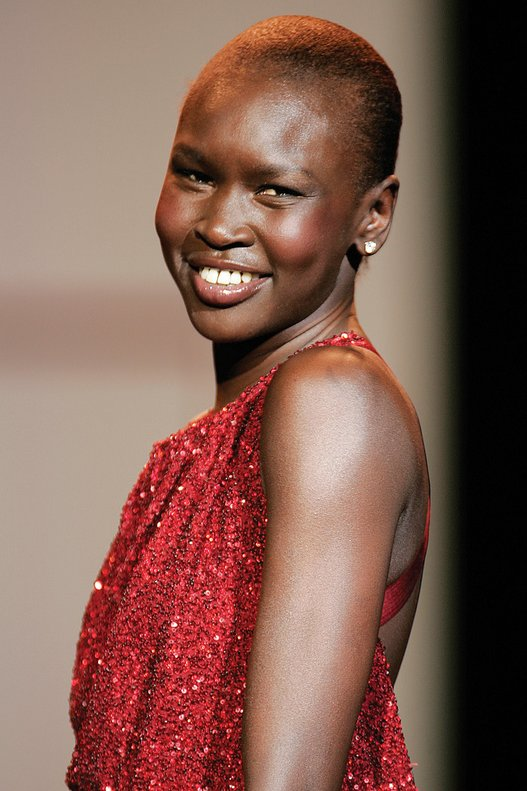
Alek Wek

- Sir Alec Issigonis – British car designer, best known for designing the Mini. His family was evacuated from Smyrna following the end of the Greco-Turkish war.
- Tanya Sarne - British fashion designer and creator of the Ghost label. Her parents were refugees (her mother was Romanian, her father French-Jewish who met in London at the end of WWII.
- Alek Wek – British supermodel. She fled Wau for Khartoum, Sudan to escape the Second Sudanese Civil War, then made her way to the UK with her family.

== Manufacturing ==
- Lakshmishankar Pathak – British citizen and founder of Patak's. Fled Kenya for the UK during the Mau Mau uprising.
- Rashmi Thakrar – British citizen and founder of Tilda Rice Company Fled Uganda for the UK during the Expulsion of Asians from Uganda in 1972.

== Music and dance ==
- Béla Bartók – Hungarian composer and pianist who went into exile in the US in 1940 as a result of his opposition to Nazism.
- Norbert Brainin – British citizen, Austrian-Jewish violinist, first violinist of the Amadeus Quartet. Driven out of Vienna after the 1938 Anschluss, fled to the UK where he eventually began playing with fellow violinists and refugees Siegmund Nissel and Peter Schidlof.
- Gloria Estefan – American-Cuban pop star. Fled Cuba for the US in 1960 after her father became a political prisoner.
- Justine Frischmann – British lead singer of Elastica. Her father was a Hungarian refugee and Holocaust survivor who was liberated from Auschwitz.
- Wyclef Jean – Haitian-American, best known as member of the Fugees. Left Haiti during the Duvalier regime and re-settled in New York City.
- K'naan (Keinan Abdi Warsame) – Somali-Canadian songwriter, rapper and hip-hop artist, best known for his song Wavin' Flag. Fled Mogadishu during the Somali Civil War at age 13, settled in Toronto.
- Erich Wolfgang Korngold – Czech-born Jewish composer, working in U.S. when Nazis came to power in Austria and could not return
- Fritzi Massary – US citizen. Austrian-Jewish operetta singer and actress. Despite her conversion to Protestantism in 1903, she was persecuted in Germany for her Jewish heritage, and fled the country in 1933, ultimately settling in the US.
- Freddie Mercury - British pop singer, songwriter and producer, best known as the lead singer/songwriter for the rock band Queen. Born a British citizen in the British Protectorate of the Sultanate of Zanzibar (now Tanzania), he and his family fled during the 1964 Zanzibar Revolution. He and his family resettled in the UK.
- Mika – Lebanese-born British singer-songwriter. Born in Beirut, Lebanon in 1983 to a Lebanese mother and American father; his family relocated to Paris in 1984 after attacks on the American Embassy during the Lebanese civil war.
- M.I.A (Mathangi "Maya" Arulpragasam) – British-born Tamil rapper, singer. Six months after her birth, her family relocated from the UK to Sri Lanka at the beginning of the Sri Lankan Civil War. As a result of her father's political activism, she and her family fled the war for London in 1987.
- Siegmund Nissel – British citizen, Austrian-Jewish violinist, member of Amadeus Quartet. Driven out of Vienna after the 1938 Anschluss, sent to the UK via Kindertransport, where he met fellow violinists and refugees Norbert Brainin and Peter Schidlof.
- Rita Ora – British singer and actress. She was born in Pristina, Kosovo to Kosovar Albanian parents. Her family fled the Kosovo war for the UK when she was 1.
- Laleh Pourkarim – Swedish-Iranian singer. Fled persecution in Iran in 1982 (her father was a prominent opponent of the regime after the Iranian Revolution), eventually found refuge in Sweden.
- Peter Schidlof – British citizen, Austrian-Jewish violinist, member of Amadeus Quartet. Driven out of Vienna after the 1938 Anschluss, fled to the UK. The Amadeus Quartet was formed with fellow refugees Norbert Brainin and Siegmund Nissel.
- Arnold Schoenberg – US citizen, Jewish-Austrian composer and painter, associated with Expressionism. Persecuted as a "degenerate" artist, in 1933 he fled the Nazi occupation and resettled in the US.
- Claude-Michel Schönberg - French composer whose works include the musicals Les Misérables and Miss Saigon. He is the son of Hungarian-Jewish refugees.
- Chaim Witz (Gene Simmons) – Israeli-American rock bass guitarist, best known as co-lead singer of the rock band Kiss. His mother was a Hungarian-Jewish Holocaust survivor.
- Regina Spektor – American singer-songwriter and pianist. Came to the U.S. with her parents at the age of 9 from Soviet Russia.
- György Stern (Sir Georg Solti) – British citizen, Hungarian-Jewish conductor. Fled anti-semitic laws in Hungary to work in Germany, left Germany in 1938 after the Anschluss.
- Oscar Straus (composer) – Austrian-Jewish composer of operettas and film scores. He fled Austria in 1938 after the Anschluss, first for Paris, then Hollywood.
- Robert Stolz – Austrian composer/conductor. Prior to the Anschluss he aided the escape of Jewish and political refugees across the Austro-German border, before escaping to the US himself in 1940.
- Richard Tauber – Austrian-Jewish singer, composer. He began his career in Germany, but in 1933 he was assaulted by Nazi Brownshirts, and left Germany for Austria. Nazis revoked his passport and right of abode while he was on tour in London in 1938, forcing him to apply for British citizenship.
- Felipe Andres Coronel (Immortal Technique) – African-Peruvian rapper and activist. Fled to the United States with his family in 1980, due to outbreak of internal conflict in Peru.
- Georg Ludwig von Trapp and Maria von Trapp – Austrian singers. Maria's autobiography, The Story of the Trapp Family Singers, inspired the musical The Sound of Music. They fled Austria through the Italian Alps after the Anschluss, ultimately settling in the US.

== Politics, economics, and political economy ==
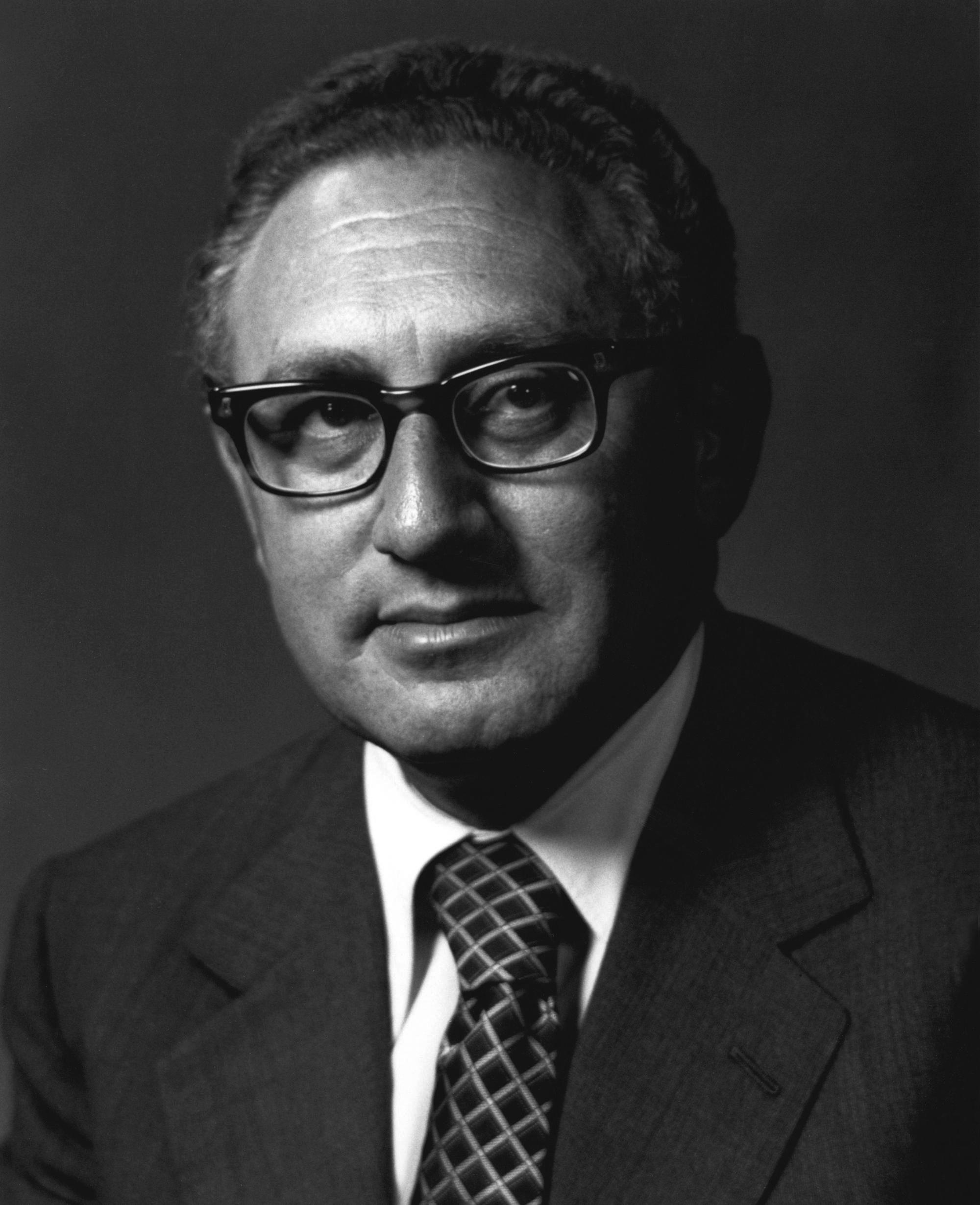
Henry Kissinger

- Madeleine Albright – Former U.S. Secretary of State. She and her family fled Czechoslovakia in 1948 and came to the US as refugees.
- Hannah Arendt – Jewish-American author and political theorist. Born in Germany, in 1933 she fled persecution by the Nazis for Czechoslovakia and then Geneva, eventually becoming a naturalized citizen of the US in 1950.
- Adrienne Clarkson – Canadian journalist and 26th Governor General of Canada. Her parents fled Hong Kong with her in 1941 and found refuge in Canada.
- Alexander Gerschenkron – Russian-born American economist. Fled Russia during Russian civil war and settled in Austria, fleeing again to the United States after the rise of fascism. He is best known for his book of essay, Economic Backwardness in Historical Perspective, which became one of the foundational texts of development economics.
- Albert O. Hirschman – German development economist and political economist. He was an active resistance fighter during the Second War World and Spanish Civil War, helping to rescue many of Europe's leading artists and intellectuals. He is best known for his work on unbalanced development and his book in political science: Exit, Voice and Loyalty.
- Michaëlle Jean – Canadian journalist and 27th Governor General of Canada. Her father fled Haiti's Duvalier regime in 1967, she and the rest of their family arrived in Canada in 1968.
- Henry Kissinger – American diplomat and political scientist who fled Germany with his family in 1938.
- Karl Marx – German philosopher, writer and journalist best known for "inventing" the political concept of Communism. He spent much of his adult life in exile as a result of his political views, but became truly stateless in 1848 when he gave up his Prussian citizenship, and was expelled from France. He remained stateless till the end of his life.
- Thandika Mkandawire – Malawian-Swedish economist, best known for his work on 'transformative social policy'. He was targeted by the regime of Dr. Hastings Kamuzu Banda and found asylum in Sweden.
- Maryam Monsef – Canadian politician. In 2015 she became Minister For Democratic Institutions. She and her family fled the Afghan Civil War in 1996, resettling in Canada.
- Ilhan Omar – Somali-American politician. Born in Somalia, her family fled the civil war there, and spent four years in a refugee camp. They immigrated to the United States. She was elected to the U.S. House of Representative in 2018.
- Karl Polanyi – Hungarian economic historian and political economist and a refugee from fascist persecution in the Vienna of 1934. He is known for his book The Great Transformation, which argued that the emergence of market-based societies in modern Europe was not inevitable but historically contingent.
- Edward Snowden – American computer security specialist, leaked information about U.S. National Security data collection, fled U.S. and received asylum in Russia.
- Tȟatȟáŋka Íyotake (Sitting Bull) – Hunkpapa Lakota holy man who led his people as a tribal chief during years of resistance to United States government policies. Took refuge with his followers in Canada in 1877 for four years, where they petitioned the Canadian government for land and food. The Canadian government refused their request, and ultimately Sitting Bull and his people were forced to return to the United States.
- Deborah Carlos Valencia Filipino refugee who founded four migrant-support organisations in Greece.
- Clara Zetkin – key leader in German Communist movement, chiefly remembered for establishing March 8 as International Women's Day; fled Nazi Germany in 1932 and took refuge in the Soviet Union.
- Chen Lin, a graduate of Harvard University, Stanford University, and China's USTC; an expert in computational economics/finance, quantum computing, astrophysics; artist(oil painting); the author of Chen model in finance; taught at Beijing Institute of Technology, Sun Yet- Sen University of China, Yonsei University of Korea, American University of Beirut, Nanyang Technological University; fled persecution by China Communist Youth Leagues/ China Youth Daily and took refuge in Heidelberg, Germany in 2016.

== Psychology and philosophy ==
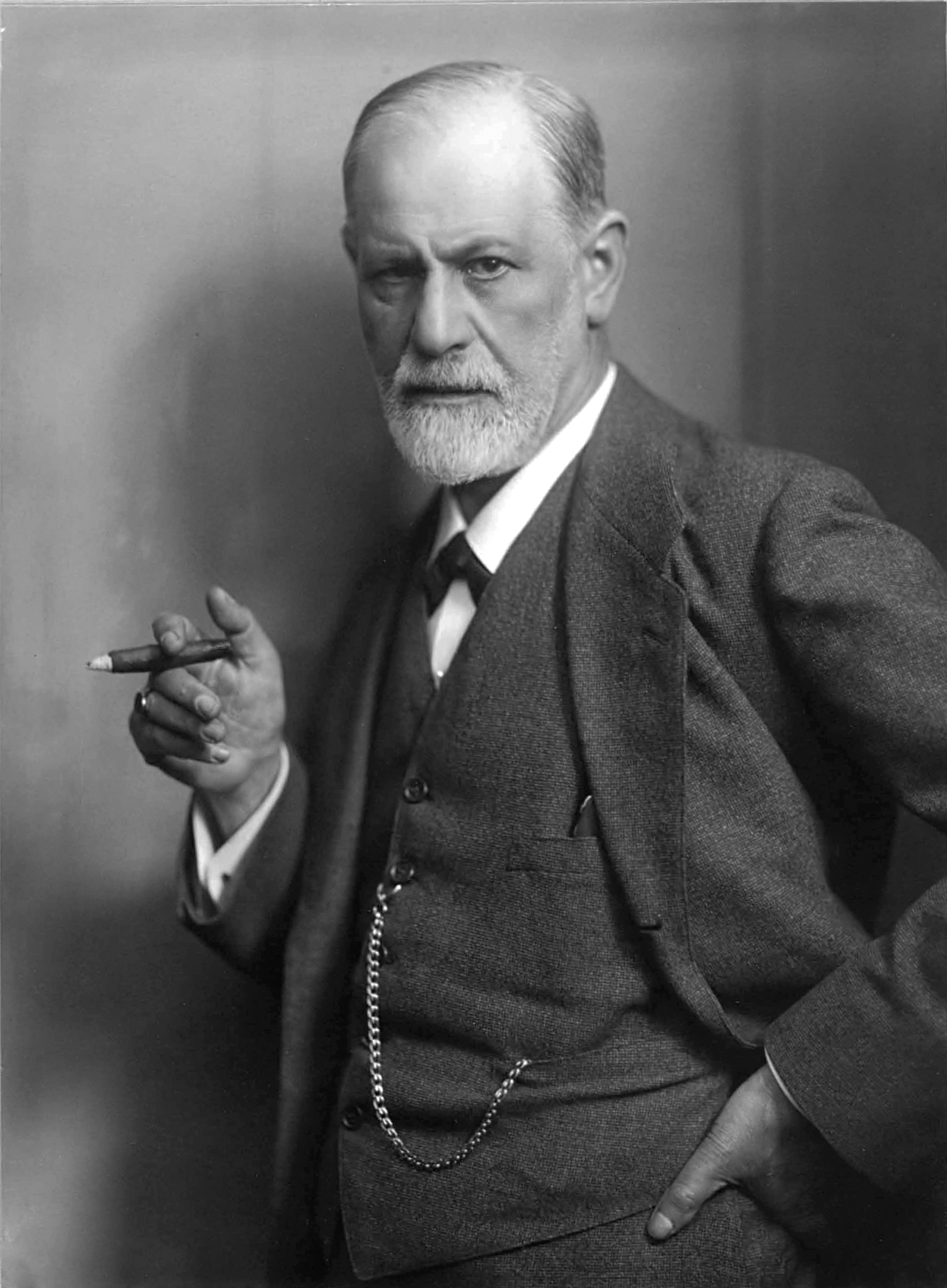
Sigmund Freud

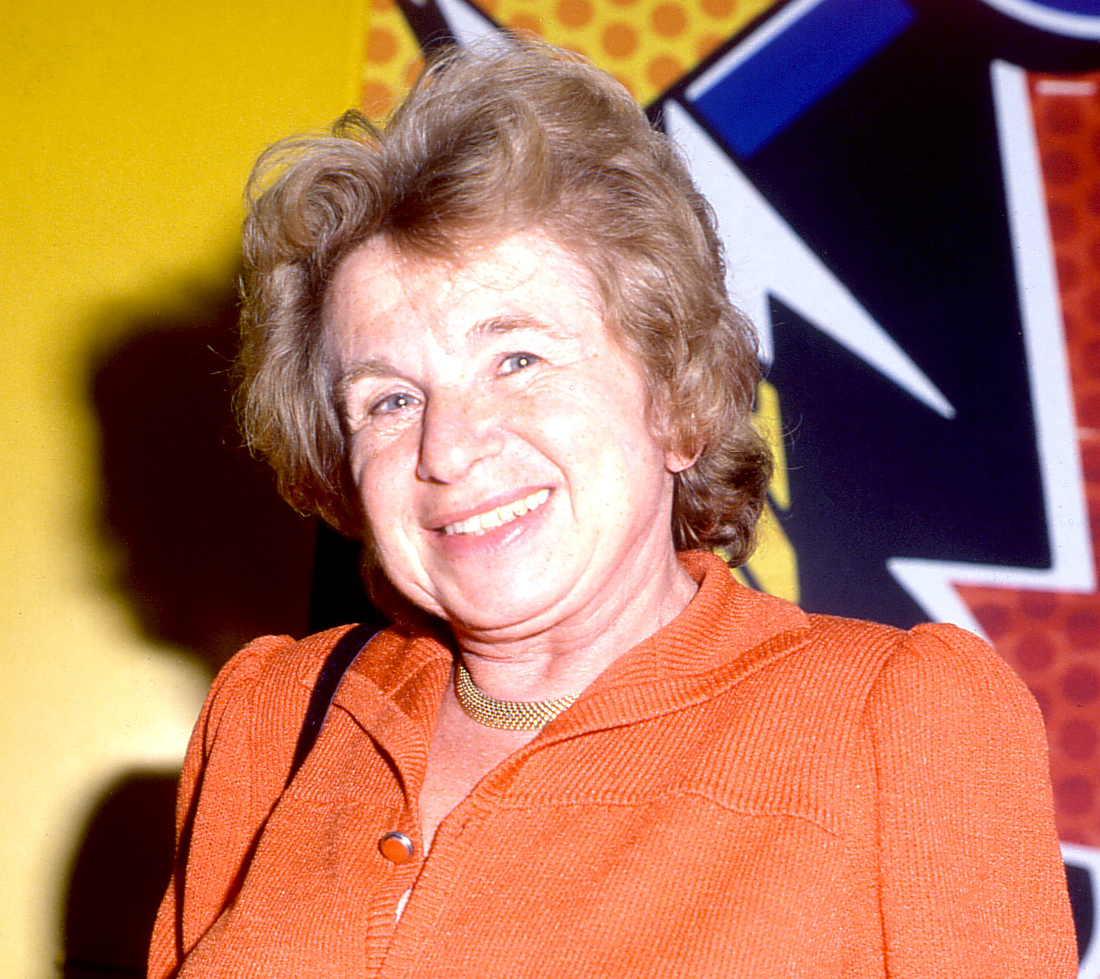
Dr. Ruth Westheimer

- Michael Balint – British citizen, Jewish-Hungarian psychoanalyst, best known as a proponent of Object relations theory. Fled persecution by Nazis for the UK in 1939.
- Sigmund Freud – Jewish-Austrian neurologist, best known as the founder of psychoanalysis. Fled persecution by the Nazis in Austria in June 1938, took refuge in the UK.
- Anna Freud – daughter of Sigmund, also a psychoanalyst. Fled persecution by the Nazis in Austria in June 1938, took refuge in the UK.
- Ernest Gellner – British citizen, Czech-Jewish philosopher and social anthropologist. Came to England in 1939 after the German occupation of Prague.
- Stephan Korner – British citizen, Czech-Jewish philosopher. Came to England in 1939 after German occupation of Czechoslovakia.
- Claude Lévi-Strauss – French-Jewish anthropologist and ethnologist. Stripped of his citizenship in 1940 under the Vichy anti-semitic laws for his Jewish ancestry, Levi-Strauss took refuge in the United States until 1948, when he returned to France.
- Lily Pincus (1898–1981), German-British social worker, marital psychotherapist and author who fled Nazi Germany in 1939
- Karl Popper – Austrian-Jewish philosopher; fled from rise of Nazism in Austria to New Zealand in 1937.
- Dr. Ruth Westheimer (Dr. Ruth) – Jewish German-American sex therapist, talk show host, author, professor, and former Haganah sniper who fled Nazi Germany for Switzerland as a 10-year-old in January 1939, as part of the Kindertransport. Both her parents were killed at Auschwitz.

== Religion ==
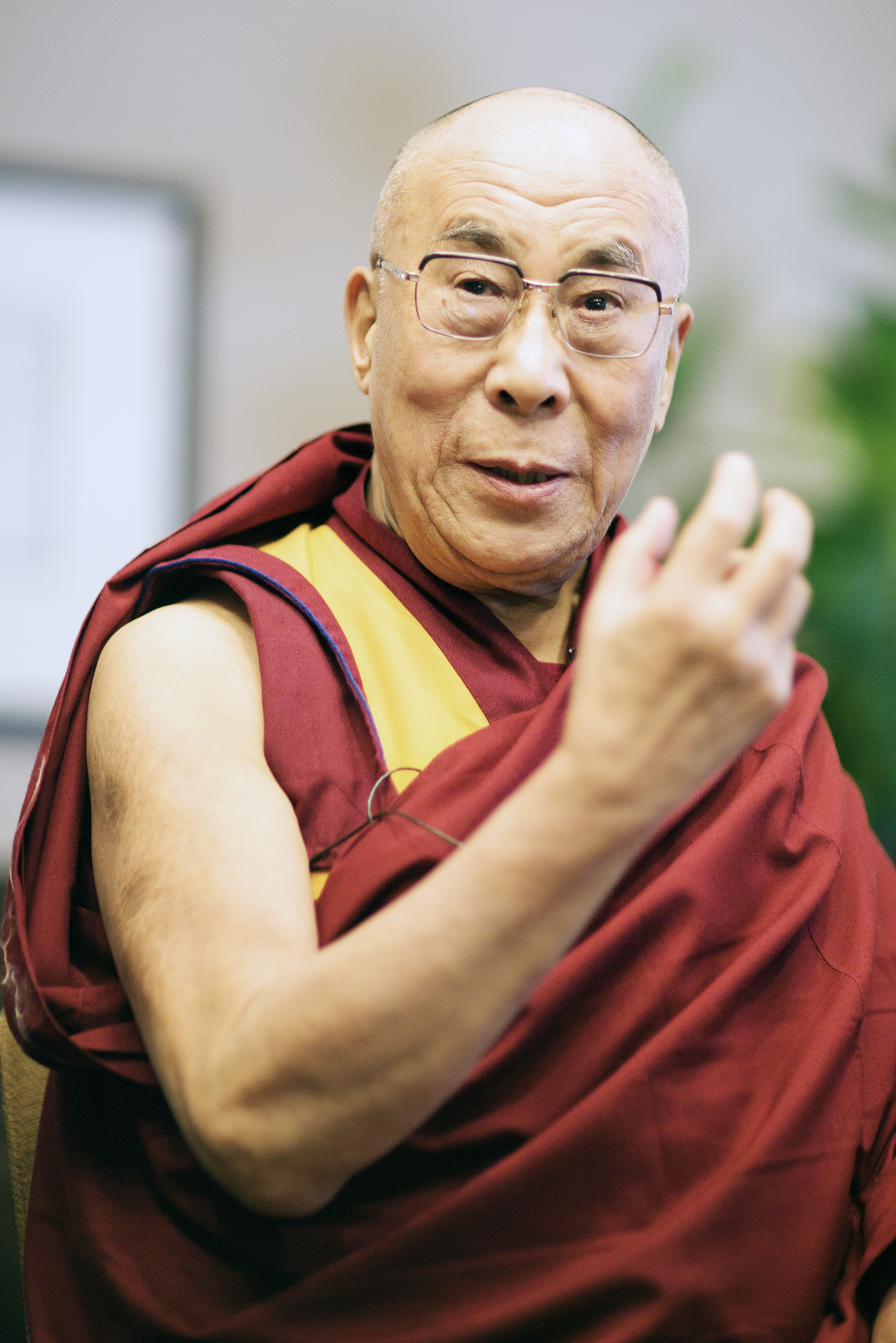
14th Dalai Lama

- Jesus and the Holy Family, according to Matthew's gospel account of their flight to Egypt due to Herod's threat
- Pope Gregory the Great was driven from Rome in 550 as a child with his family, along with most of the remaining population of the city by King Totila, during the Gothic war
- Theodore of Tarsus fled his home for Constantinople during either the Persian or Arab invasions of the Eastern Byzantine Empire in the 7th century
- Adrian of Canterbury fled from North Africa to Italy during the Muslim invasions of North Africa in the 640s
- Sophronius of Jerusalem fled during the Persian-Byzantine war of the early 7th-century, but returned later
- Maximus the Confessor fled from the vicinity of Constantinople for Crete and later to Carthage around the time of the Persian siege of Constantinople during the Persian-Byzantine war
- Isaac Abravanel – rabbi and politician – fled from Portugal to Spain
- Rabbi Leo Baeck – Reform rabbi and holocaust survivor
- Rabbi Hugo Gryn – Reform rabbi and holocaust survivor
- Tenzin Gyatso (14th Dalai Lama) – a refugee, fled from Tibet Autonomous Region, China during the 1959 Tibetan uprising.
- Rabbi Immanuel Jakobovits – Chief rabbi of Great Britain – fled from the Nazis to Britain
- Paul Kahle – Christian Hebraist – fled from the Nazis to Britain
- Mullah Krekar – Iraqi Kurdish mullah, lives in Norway
- Vincent Nguyen – Canadian, Auxiliary Catholic Bishop of Toronto. Fled Vietnam in 1983 and settled in Canada.(See also Vietnamese Boat People)
- Dieter F. Uchtdorf – First Presidency of the Church of Jesus Christ of Latter-day Saints, refugee from Czechoslovakia and subsequently from East Germany

== Science and technology ==
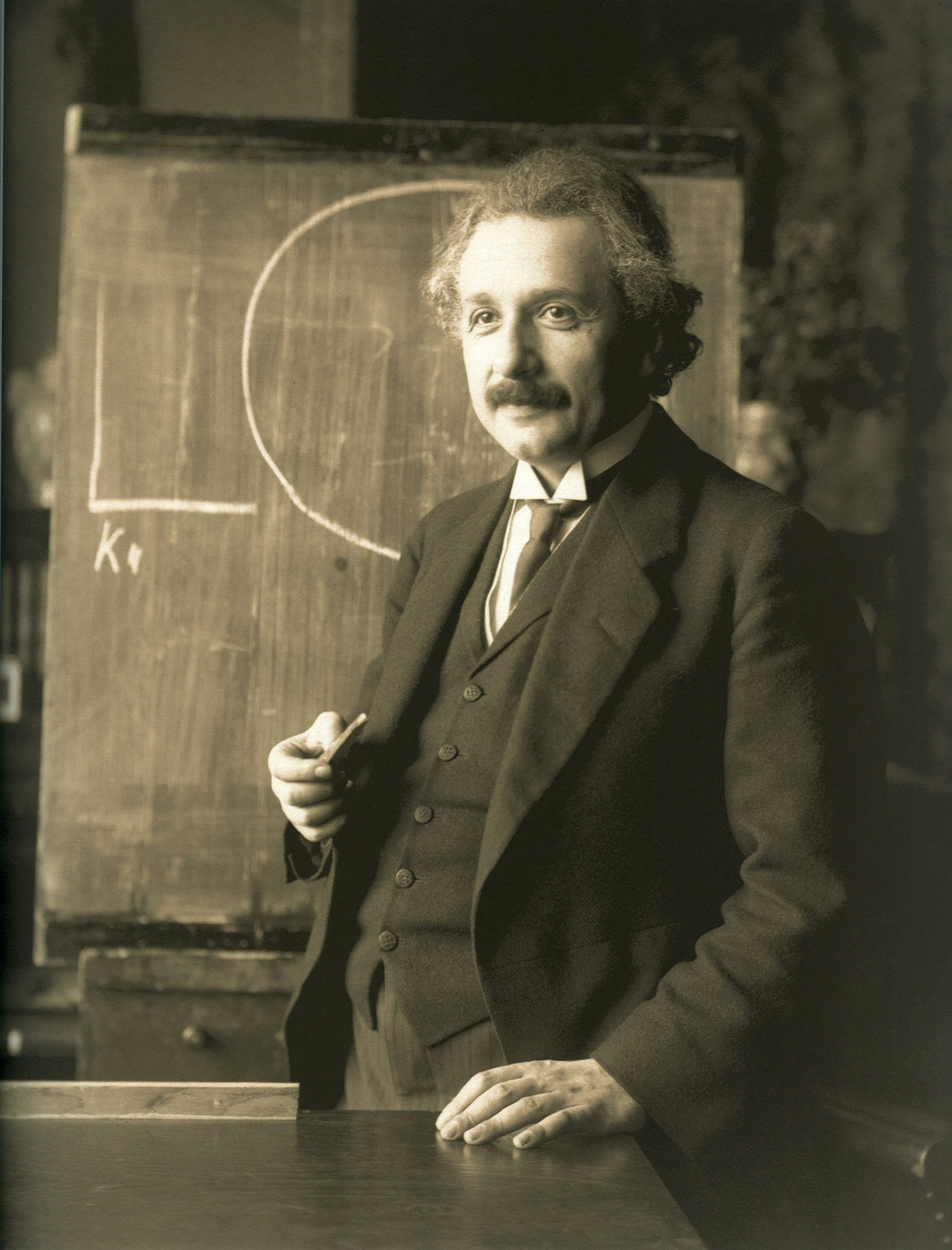
Albert Einstein

- Sergey Brin – Co-founder of Google – Russian-Jewish refugee
- Gustav Victor Rudolf Born - pharmacologist - German-Jewish refugee
- Max Born - Nobel Prize for physics - German-Jewish refugee
- Edith Bulbring - pharmacologist - German-Jewish refugee
- Constantin Carathéodory- Greek mathematician who spent most of his professional career in Germany. Taught in Turkey until the 1922 Great Fire of Smyrna, when he fled with books he had saved from the university's library to Athens.
- Carl Djerassi - the inventor of the first contraceptive pill. He was an Austrian refugee
- John Dollond - inventor of the achromatic lens. He founded Dollond and Aitchison; descended from Huguenot refugees
- Albert Einstein – Nobel Prize-winning physicist (1921) for his theory of relativity; German-Jewish refugee who escaped Nazi Germany by taking a post at Princeton in 1938.
- Enrico Fermi – Nobel Prize-winning physicist (1938) for his work on nuclear reactions; member of the Manhattan Project; moved with his family to America in 1938 to escape Italy's anti-semitic laws.
- Robert Fano – physicist – Italian-Jewish refugee
- Ugo Fano – physicist – Italian-Jewish refugee
- Nicholas Georgescu-Roegen – a Romanian American progenitor and paradigm founder in economics, whose work was seminal in establishing ecological economics – fled when the communists took power in Romania in 1948.
- Alexander Grothendieck – mathematician – German-Jewish refugee
- Erik Jorpes – Finnish biochemist who fled to Sweden after the Finnish Civil War.
- Bernard Katz – Nobel Prize-winning biophysicist – German-Jewish refugee
- Walter Kohn – theoretical physicist who won the Nobel Prize (1998) in Chemistry for Density-Functional Theory; left Austria for England via Kindertransport
- Sir Hans Krebs – Nobel Prize-winning scientist – German-Jewish refugee
- Sir John Krebs – zoologist – son of Sir Hans Krebs
- Liviu Librescu, physicist; fled from Romania to Israel
- Lord (Claus) Moser – British professor of statistics and head of the Government Statistical Service – Austrian-Jewish refugee
- Charles Proteus Steinmetz – mathematics and electrical engineering – German-Polish refugee. he identified and explained, through a mathematical equation that later became known as the Law of Hysterisis, or Steinmetz's Law, phenomena governing power losses, leading to breakthroughs in both alternating- and direct-current electrical systems.
- Dame Stephanie Shirley – British information technology pioneer and philanthropist, best known for founding Xansa. Arrived in the UK in 1938 as an unaccompanied child refugee from Germany as part of the Kindertransport.

== Sport ==
- Alexander Alekhine – chess world champion, who moved from communist Russia to France
- Ossip Bernstein – chess grandmaster, who escape from Communistic Ukraine to France
- Efim Bogoljubow – chess grandmaster, who moved from the Soviet Union to Germany
- Fedor Bohatirchuk – chess grandmaster, who moved from Ukraine to Canada
- Joel Casamayor – former Lightweight champion in boxing, fled from Cuba to U.S.
- Luol Deng – Chicago Bulls basketball player and NBA All-Star. Moved from Sudan to Great Britain
- Mebrahtom Keflezighi – Olympic marathon silver medallist, Eritrean refugee to U.S. (via Italy)
- Lomana Tresor LuaLua – a striker/winger who plays for Blackpool, he migrated from Kinshansa, DR Congo to the U.K.
- Yusra Mardini – Syrian swimmer who was a member of the Refugee Olympic Athletes Team during the 2016 Summer Olympics, she moved from Syria to Germany
- Fabrice Muamba – Congolese refugee in the United Kingdom, became a football player for Bolton
- Ashot Nadanian – chess player, who moved from Azerbaijan to Armenia
- Kwity Paye – American football player, Liberian refugee born in Guinea
- Mario Stanic – former footballer with Chelsea. He used to play for Sarajevo F.C. who were targeted during the Bosnian War
- Christopher Wreh – former Arsenal footballer and Liberian refugee

== TV and film ==
- Zohra Daoud – former Afghani actress and model, now settled in Malibu, California
- Omid Djalili – comedian and actor. He and his family are Iranian refugees
- Anh Do – Australian comedian, Anh Do and his family fled in a boat to Australia as refugees in 1980
- Ben Elton – comedian and grandson of a Czechoslovak refugee
- Andy Garcia – actor and director fled Castro's Cuba with his parents when he was five
- Baron Lew Grade – television mogul and uncle of Michael Grade. He was a Russian refugee
- Fritz Lang – film director, and a half-Jewish refugee
- Jerry Springer – talk show host. His parents were German refugees
- Rachel Weisz – actress. Both her parents are Jewish refugees
- Billy Wilder – film director and writer, and a Jewish refugee
- Dagmara Domińczyk – actress. She fled to the United States with her parents and sisters in 1983 due to her parents' political associations (her father's involvement with Amnesty International and the Solidarity movement)
- Zoltán Buday – actor. He and his family were Hungarian refugees who fled to Canada due to the Hungarian Revolution.

== Writing and publishing ==
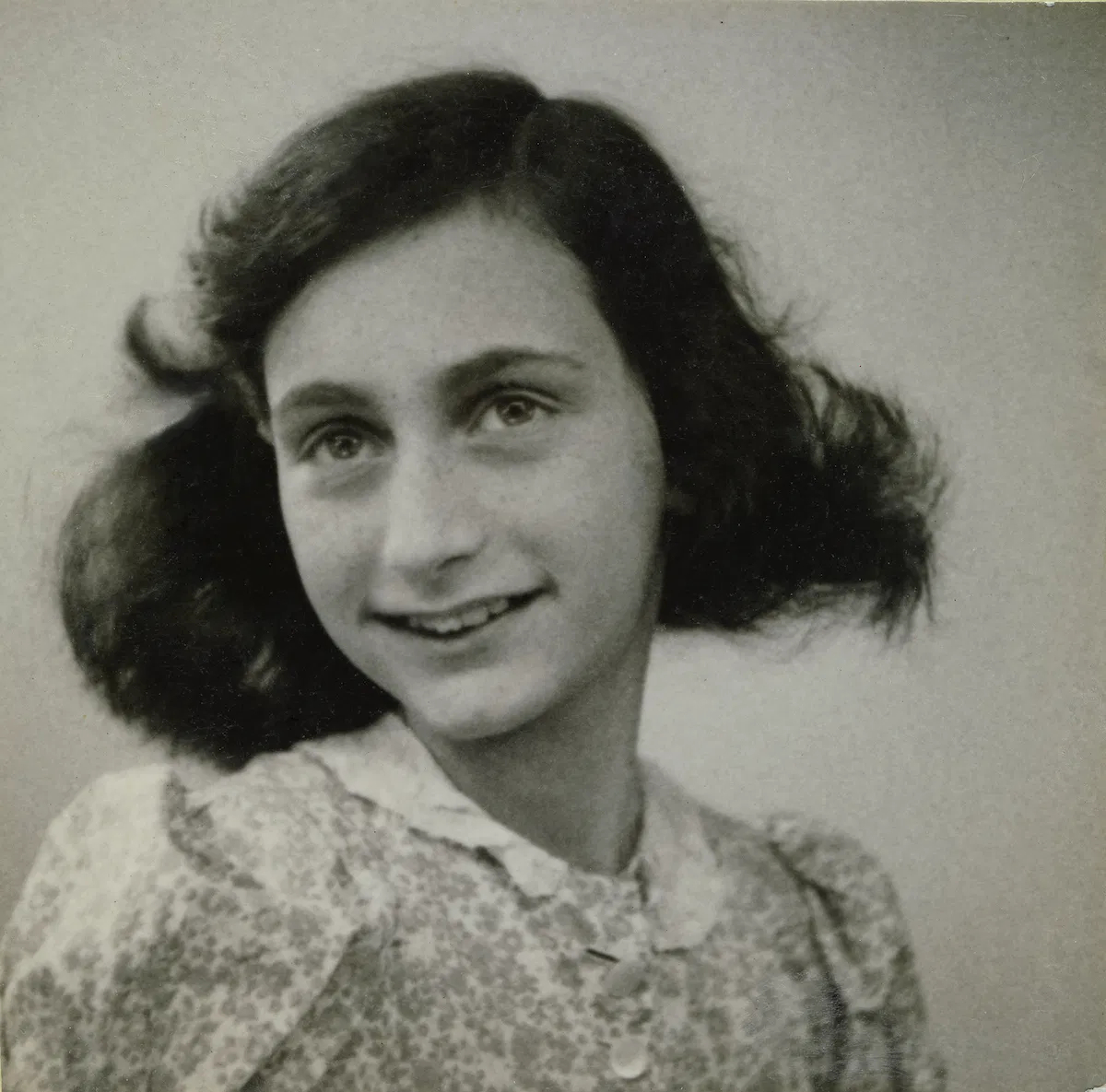
Anne Frank

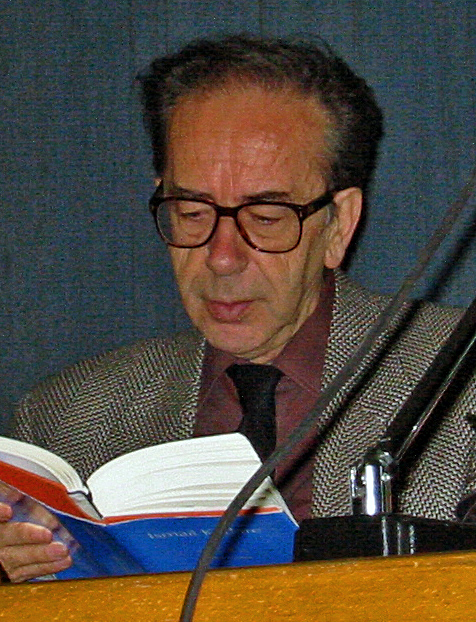
Ismail Kadare

- Brownkey Abdullahi – Dadaab born blogger
- Yasmin Alibhai-Brown – journalist and author, and a Ugandan refugee
- Isabel Allende – author of The House of Spirits. She is a Chilean refugee who fled after receiving death threats following the overthrow of her father's cousin, Salvador Allende
- Akuch Kuol Anyieth – South-Sudanese-Australian writer.
- Reinaldo Arenas – Cuban novelist. Became a refugee in the US after years of persecution for his sexuality and political ideas. His autobiography, Before Night Falls, was on the New York Times list of the ten best books of the year 1993 and was made into a film in 2000
- Bertolt Brecht – German playwright, refugee from the Nazis during World War II
- Elias Canetti – a Bulgarian refugee, he won the Nobel Prize in Literature in 1981
- Joseph Conrad – author of Heart of Darkness and a refugee.
- Anne Frank – German-Jewish teen who fled with her family to the Netherlands during WWII. Her book The Diary of a Young Girl is one of the most widely known and poignant accounts of the refugee experience.
- Karen Gershon – as a child she fled from Nazi Germany to Great Britain
- Michael Hamburger – as a child he fled from Nazi Germany to London
- Lord Paul Hamlyn CBE – a Jewish refugee from Germany. He was the founder of Octopus Publishing Group
- Chu Văn Hợp – Vietnamese-Australian newspaper editor and business person
- Victor Hugo – author of Les Misérables and The Hunchback of Notre-Dame. Due to his political beliefs, he was forced to flee France several times
- Guillermo Cabrera Infante – Cuban writer and journalist. Became a refugee in the UK. Honoured with the Cervantes Prize in 1997
- Ruth Prawer Jhabvala – novelist and film screenwriter – German-Jewish refugee
- Ismail Kadare – Albanian novelist and poet. Claimed political asylum in France in 1990.
- Judith Kerr – children's writer – German-Jewish refugee
- Rigoberta Menchú – an author and Guatemalan refugee. She won the Nobel Peace Prize in 1992
- Thomas Mann – winner of the 1929 Nobel Prize in Literature. He moved from Germany to Switzerland and from there to the US
- Vladimir Nabokov – Russian author and lepidopterist. Escaped to Europe from the Russian Civil War and then to the United States from the advance of Nazi Germany
- Ursula Owen – editor of Index on Censorship. She was a German refugee as a baby
- Felix Salten – author of Bambi – Hungarian-born Jewish refugee from Nazis
- Joe Schlesinger – Austrian-born Canadian television journalist and author was a Jewish refugee. In 1938, he was sent to England from Czechoslovakia to escape the Nazis as part of the Kindertransport that rescued 669 Jewish children. His parents, who couldn't escape with him, were later killed in the Holocaust.
- Shyam Selvadurai – Canadian novelist, refugee from Sri Lanka as a teenager
- Aleksandr Solzhenitsyn – Russian writer, winner of 1970 Nobel Prize in Literature. Deported from the USSR in 1974 as a result of his criticism of the Soviet system, returned to Russia from the United States in 1994 after the dissolution of the Soviet System.
- Samuel Ullman – German-born poet
- Loung Ung – a survivor of the Killing Fields of Cambodia, is an activist and author of the books, First They Killed My Father and Lucky Child

== Miscellaneous ==
- Alina Fernández – daughter of Fidel Castro, fled Cuba to Spain, now lives in the United States. Former model, now hosts a talk show
- Otto Kahn-Freund – lawyer – German Jew who fled Nazi Germany to the United Kingdom
- Maya Ghazal – pilot and UNHCR Goodwill Ambassador
- Moud Goba – LGBTIQ+ human rights activist, fled Zimbabwe to the United Kingdom
- Christoph Meili – whistleblower – fled from Switzerland to the United States, because an arrest warrant was issued against him
- Merhan Karimi Nasseri – an Iranian refugee who lived in the departure lounge of Terminal One in Charles de Gaulle Airport from 26 August 1988 – July 2006. See also the film The Terminal (2004), directed by Steven Spielberg, and the opera Flight, by Jonathan Dove.
- Daria Khrystenko – a Ukrainian teacher and humanitarian who fled to Poland due to the Russian invasion of Ukraine.
