= Saadia Idris =

- Born: (approx. 1996); South Sudan
- Occupations: Community mobilizer, mentor
- Known for: GBV awareness, refugee community advocacy

Saadia Idris (born c. 1996) is a South Sudanese refugee and community mobilizer based in Kakuma Refugee Camp, Kenya. At 17, she fled conflict in her home country and has since devoted herself to supporting women and girls in her refugee community.

== Biography ==
Saadia Idris was forced to flee South Sudan at age 17 when war devastated her country and she was separated from her family. She resettled in Kenya's Kakuma Refugee Camp, where she emerged as a community mobilizer and mentor, working to empower displaced women and children.

== Advocacy and Work ==
Partnering with UNHCR and other organizations, Saadia advocates for gender-based violence (GBV) awareness and strives to enhance access to referral pathways for GBV survivors, including psychosocial support, case management, and medical assistance, particularly for women, children, and girls in the refugee community. In addition, she provides mentorship to young refugee girls, connecting them with peers who have had similar experiences to foster safe and supportive networks. Her work nurtures resilience and self-confidence among vulnerable youth.

== Context: Kakuma Refugee Camp ==
Kakuma Refugee Camp, located in northwestern Kenya, is home to refugees from South Sudan, Somalia, Ethiopia, the Democratic Republic of the Congo, and other nations. The camp hosts hundreds of thousands of displaced persons and serves as a multi-faceted hub for humanitarian efforts, while also producing local community leaders like Saadia Idris.

== See also ==
- South Sudanese Civil War
- Luise Radlmeier
- Mercy Akuot
- Akuch Kuol Anyieth
- William Akio
- Mercy Akuot
- Aliir Aliir
- Mac Andrew
- Akuch Kuol Anyieth
- Atem Kuol Atem
