= Mercy Akuot =

South Sudanese women's rights activist

- Born: 1993 (age 32–33); South Sudan
- Occupation: women's rights activist

Mercy Akuot Marang is a South Sudanese social activist and singer. She currently lives in Kenya.

== Biography ==
She was born in South Sudan and hails from the Dinka community of South Sudan. She performed well in school and aspired to become a lawyer. Mercy escaped from her parents at the age of just 15 when her parents willfully forced her to marry her own uncle who was much older than her. She left South Sudan in 2008 and initially got asylum in Uganda. However, her 56 year old uncle tracked her location in Kampala and she revealed that she had suffered physical violence, rape and unlawful detention from him. She later moved to Kenya in 2015 after escaping from her uncle and was admitted as an immigrant in the Kakuma Refugee camp in Kenya. By June 2024, Akuot and her three children were living in the Dadaab refugee camp in Kenya, where she continued to use music to spread messages of hope.

== Career ==
Although she had the ambition of becoming a professional lawyer, she pursued her career as a social worker and women's rights activist due to the circumstances she met at her young age. She also advocates against the child marriage as she herself had the experience of surviving the forced attempt of child marriage by her own parents.

She also serves as an ambassador for the refugees at the Kakuma Refugee camp in Kenya. She is also currently serving as a volunteer with Danish Refugee Council for their women empowerment programme in the camp. In June 2018, she participated alongside fellow refugees at TEDxKakuma Camp which was historically the first ever TEDx event in the world to have been held in a refugee camp. During the 2018 TEDx event, she shared her experiences of how she escaped the child marriage and then later becoming a women's rights activist.

Mercy was chosen as one of the two musical artists under the FilmAid's Finding a Star project which was done in collaboration with Kenyan R&B musician Wyre. The project was also known as Making Stars-Kakuma as the project was initiated with the support of Wyre who was interested in helping talented aspiring musicians in the Kakuma camp. It was revealed that Finding a Star project assisted Mercy to kick-start her professional musical career. She released her first official single titled Anavyonifanya in 2018.

In December 2020, she launched an album titled Bado Mapema (It's Still Early) alongside two other women refugees (Lisa Queen and Mlay) in the Kenyan camp. The album depicts the own harsh realities and experiences of Mercy and other women refugees.

In August 2021, she was listed as one of the seven African women activists who deserve a Wikipedia article by the Global Citizen, an international organisation and advocacy organisation.

== Discography ==
- Anavyonifanya - 2018
- Bado Mapema - 2020

== See also ==
- Luise Radlmeier
- Akuch Kuol Anyieth
- William Akio
- Aliir Aliir
- Saadia Idris
- Mac Andrew
- Atem Kuol Atem
