= Atem =

Atem may refer to:

== People ==
- Atem Kuol Atem, South-Sudanese–Australian basketball player
- David Manyok Barac Atem, South Sudanese military leader
- Valentine Atem, Cameroonian footballer

== Other uses ==
- Atem (album), Tangerine Dream's 1973 space music release
- Association for Tertiary Education Management (ATEM), Australasia

== See also ==
- Yami Yugi (or Pharaoh Atem), in the Yu-Gi-Oh! manga
- Atum, an Egyptian creator god
