= Mary Maker =

South Sudanese Goodwill Ambassador and advocate

- Occupation: Teacher Actor Writer
- Known for: Education Advocacy

Mary Maker is a South Sudanese refugee, UNHCR Goodwill Ambassador and education advocate. She is a former teacher at Kakuma Refugee Camp to a class of 120 students. She is also an actor, TED speaker, and a writer.

== Early life ==
Mary Maker was born in South Sudan during the civil war. She fled her home country as an infant to Kakuma Regugee Camp. She found a temporary shelter in Kakuma.

== Education ==
Mary is currently pursuing further studies in Theater and Political Science with a concentration in Women and Gender Studies at St. Olaf College Minnesota after receiving a scholarship from Mastercard Foundation scholarship program.

== Achievements ==
In 2021, Mary Maker joined hands with Dudi Miabok and Diing Manyang who are her fellow refugees in founding Elimisha Kakuma, a college preparatory educational program for high school graduates in the Kakuma camp.

She also appeared in Ep. 355 of "The Career Ladder" where she shared her experiences with the host.

== See also ==
- Kakuma Refugee Camp, Kenya
- TED Speakers
- Ger Duany
- Emtithal Mahmoud
- Mercy Akuot
