= Sieng van Tran =

Sieng Van Tran
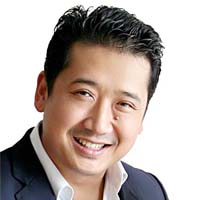
- Born: 30 April 1975 (age 50); Vietnam
- Occupation(s): entrepreneur, inventor
- Known for: iLearn.To, UNHCR, Dragonchain Academy
- Title: Sieng Van Tran

Sieng Van Tran (born 30 April 1975) is a British entrepreneur and prominent refugee who came to the UK in 1981. He studied artificial intelligence at Middlesex University and founded the eLearning company iLearn.To, the first profitable UK internet learning company in 1999. iLearn.To delivered over 500 online courses from Harvard, McGraw-Hill and the BBC for Business. It used artificial intelligence software from Autonomy to tailor help to user queries. It was initially backed by Alan Watkins, former MD of Cisco.

Identified by the UNHCR, Sieng van Tran is on a list of famous refugees and took part in a 50th anniversary video campaign alongside other prominent refugees such as Madeleine Albright. The video lip sync to "Respect" by Aretha Franklin also featured human rights activist and Nobel Peace Prize winner Rigoberta Menchú Tum.

In 2007, he sold AuctionAssist, an eCommerce facilitator to AIM-listed company ArgetnVive Plc for £2.6 million.

On 27 March 2008, Sieng filed for a patent on a new method for eCommerce with the United States Patent Office.

Sieng also founded the Egg Accelerator in Vietnam which was initially started to help people from his hometown, a fishing village, to develop technical skills and work in technology. In 2014, Egg Accelerator was invited to join the Hanwha Dreamplus Alliance, a US$100 billion Korean conglomerate.

In 2018 Sieng was appointed as President of the Dragonchain Academy, a foundation project designed to develop blockchain competency.
