= Smile Train =

Children's charity for cleft defects

- Formation: 1999; 27 years ago
- Type: 501(c)(3) nonprofit
- Headquarters: New York City, New York, United States
- Chief Executive Officer: Susannah Schaefer
- Website: smiletrain.org

Smile Train is a nonprofit organization and charity providing corrective surgery for children with cleft lips and palates. Headquartered in New York City and founded in 1999, Smile Train provides free corrective cleft surgery in 87 countries, along with training local doctors and providing hospital funding for the procedures.

== History ==
Smile Train was created in 1998 by Brian Mullaney and Charles Wang, who had previously worked with Operation Smile. They felt the most efficient way to provide cleft surgery was to train and support local doctors rather than to fly in Western doctors to provide surgeries in poor, developing countries. Local doctors would also be able to provide care year-round rather than the limited engagements of the "mission-based" model.

In 1999, Smile Train approached Court B. Cutting of New York University's Virtual Research Laboratory to create training videos, which could be used to train local doctors on how to perform advanced cleft surgery techniques. The 3D models used in the videos were based on the CT scan of two Chinese patients. Smile Train distributes the DVDs to local doctors worldwide. The DVDs are available in English, Spanish, and Mandarin.

In 1999, Smile Train began providing corrective surgeries in China. The charity worked with the then-US President George H. W. Bush and CCP General Secretary Jiang Zemin, in the planning of Smile Train's first operation in China.

Smile Train began working in India in 2000. In 2011, Aishwarya Rai, became Smile Train's first goodwill ambassador. As of 2025, Telugu actress Pavani Gangireddy is the new goodwill ambassador of Smile Train India.

== Early recognition and criticism ==
In a 2008 New York Times article, economist Steven Levitt of Freakonomics fame indicated that the organization's model and its technological innovations "likely make Smile Train one of the most productive charities, dollar for deed, in the world."

In 2009, the documentary Smile Pinki, which was sponsored by Smile Train and directed by Megan Mylan, won the 2008 Oscar for Best Documentary (Short Subject). The film shows the story of a poor girl in rural India whose life is transformed when she receives free surgery to correct her cleft lip.

Smile Train worked with the Scottish charity KidsOR to revamp 30 operating theatres in Africa. This encompassed three in Nigeria, including in Kano, revamping an operating theatre there in the city's Armed Forces Specialist Hospital in 2022.

In 2008, CharityWatch criticized then-president Brian Mullaney's $420,209 salary and questioned the 2007 company's tax form, which said Mullaney's salary came from temporary restricted funds designed to go toward overhead. In 2009, Givewell could not assess the impact of Smile Train's activities based on the charity's 2008 tax form and other publicly accessible information. Mullaney departed the charity in 2012.

== See also ==
- List of cleft lip and palate organisations
- List of non-governmental organizations in the People's Republic of China
