= Daria Khrystenko =

Ukrainian refugee turned charity worker for refugees

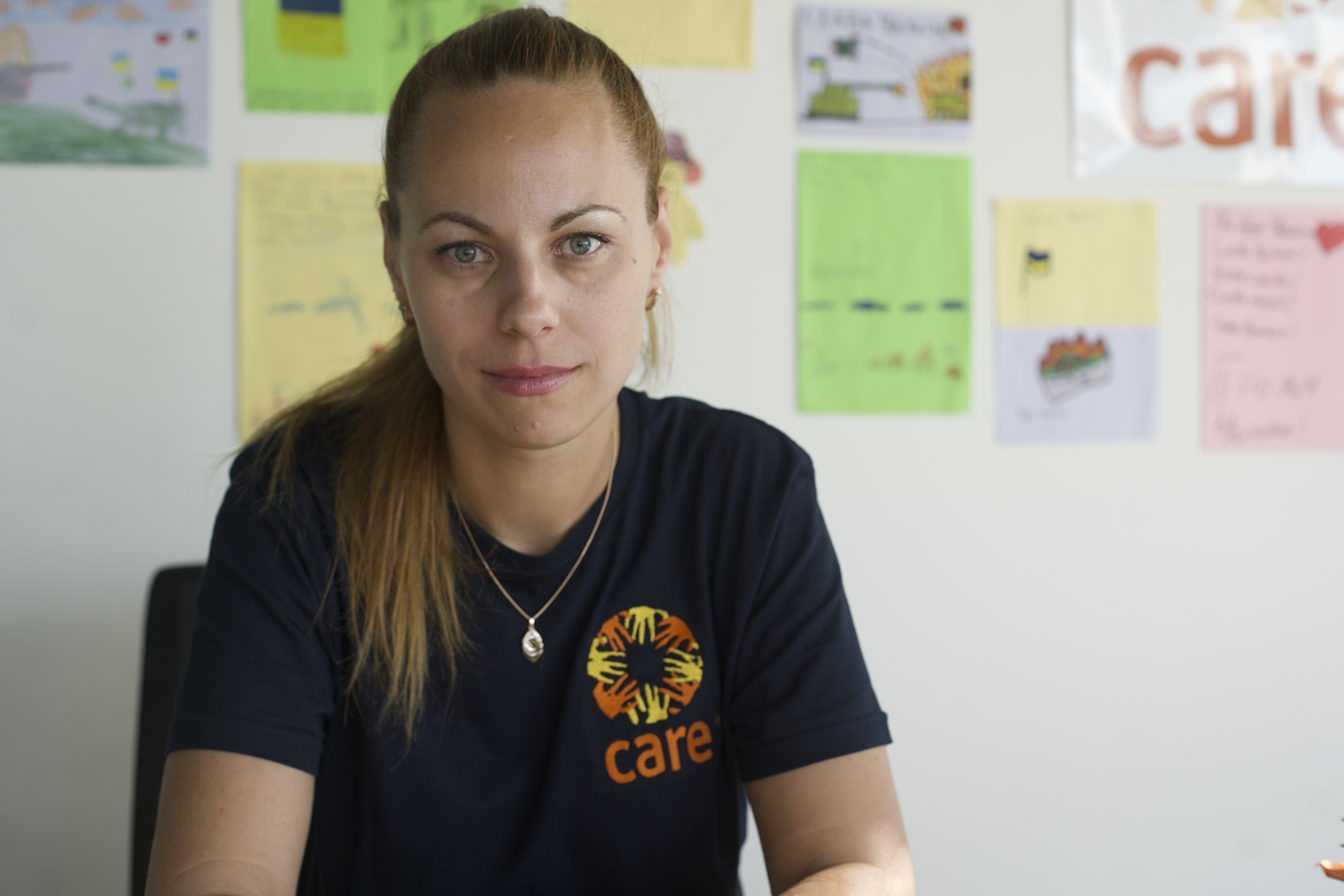
- Citizenship: Ukrainian

Daria Khrystenko is a Ukrainian teacher, refugee and humanitarian, known for speaking widely about her experience of fleeing the conflict in Ukraine and rebuilding her life in Poland.

== Biography ==
Khrystenko was a teacher living in Kyiv until she fled the country with her mother and son due to the Russian invasion of Ukraine.

Khrystenko is fluent in Ukrainian, Russian, English and Polish.

== Activism as a refugee ==
After fleeing to Warsaw, in April 2022 Khrystenko signed up to be a teacher in Polish schools with the cash-for-work program sponsored by international humanitarian charity CARE International and the Polish Centre for International Aid. Khrystenko subsequently joined in helping Ukrainian refugees who had fled to Poland. Khrystenko has been acting as teacher for Ukrainian children adapting to Polish schooling, a translator between refugees and local charities, and a spokesperson for Ukrainian refugees and displaced people.

In June 2022, Khrystenko joined six other women and girls from around the world who wrote to G7 leaders ahead of the G7 Summit. Khrystenko, citing her own experiencing as a refugee, called on leaders to "support vulnerable refugees from Ukraine without existing support systems" as well as refugees worldwide.

Khrystenko is interviewed regularly in the media about her experiences as a Ukrainian refugee. In February 2023, Khrystenko returned to her hometown in Ukraine to visit her father and grandmother for the first time since the conflict began. She was interviewed about this experience by Sophie Ellis-Bextor and Helen Pankhurst in the #Walk4Women podcast, produced by Stylist Magazine and CARE International.

== See also ==
- List of refugees
- 2022 Ukrainian refugee crisis
