= Martin Lovett =

English cellist (1927–2020)

Martin Lovett OBE
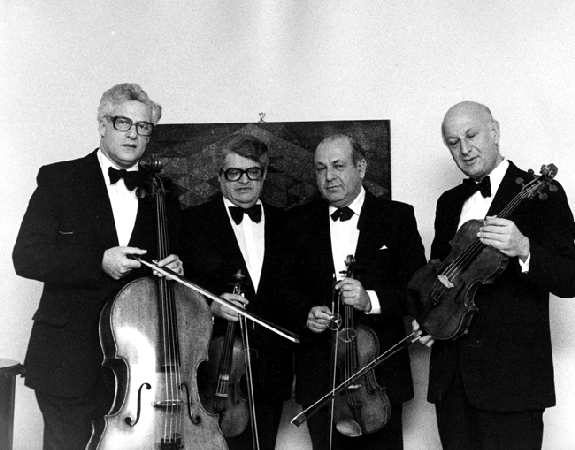
- Amadeus Quartet, from left: Lovett, Brainin, Nissel, Schidlof
- Born: 3 March 1927; Stoke Newington, London, England
- Died: 29 April 2020 (aged 93); London, England
- Education: Royal College of Music
- Occupation: Cellist
- Organizations: Amadeus Quartet
- Awards: Order of Merit of the Federal Republic of Germany; Austrian Cross of Honour for Science and Art

Martin Lovett OBE (3 March 1927 – 29 April 2020) was an English cellist, best known for his work for 40 years with the Amadeus Quartet, one of the leading string quartets at the time.

== Life and career ==
Lovett was born in Stoke Newington (north-east London) on 3 March 1927. When he was 11, his father, a cellist with the Hallé Orchestra and the London Philharmonic Orchestra, gave him his first lessons. At age 15, he won a scholarship to study at the Royal College of Music in London. He joined the Amadeus Quartet at the age of 19, in 1947, with violinists Norbert Brainin and Siegmund Nissel, and violist Peter Schidlof. He was the only English player in the quartet of otherwise Austrian refugees. They remained together for 40 years, until the death of Schidlof in 1987, when they decided to disband. They recorded many quartets, including Beethoven's complete string quartets, and also in 1968 Schubert's Quintet "The Trout", D. 667, with pianist Emil Gilels and double bassist Rainer Zepperitz.

After the end of the Amadeus Quartet, Lovett was much in demand for performances with various chamber music groups including the Amadeus Ensemble. He gave chamber music courses all over the world. The Amadeus Summer Course, held each year at the Royal Academy of Music in London, was a highlight of this activity. He joined the Verdi Quartet for a 1989 recording of Schubert's String Quintet, D. 956.

A former Fellow of the Royal Society of Arts, he also acted as a judge in many international chamber music competitions. As a quartet member, Lovett was awarded the OBE, the Order of Merit of the Federal Republic of Germany, and the Austrian Cross of Honour for Science and Art.

Lovett was married for 55 years to Suzanne Rosza, whom he met while they studied at the Royal College of Music. They had two children, Sonia and Peter, five grandchildren and eight great-grandchildren. He later remarried, to the writer Dorinde Van Oort.

He died in North London on 29 April 2020, aged 93. News of his death was first announced by his daughter, Sonia, who confirmed that it was due to complications from COVID-19.
