= KidsOR =

Scottish charity

Kids Operating Room
- Founded: 2018
- Founders: Nicola and Garreth Wood MBE
- Type: Charity
- Location: UK

Kids Operating Room is a Scottish charity founded by Garreth and Nicola Wood in 2018. The charity create capacity for paediatric surgery across the world by installing paediatric operating rooms, training workforce and addressing critical gaps in low- and middle-income countries with the aim of bringing access to safe surgery to every child who needs it. Based in Scotland, Kids Operating Room have shipped and installed theatres to over 35 countries across Africa, Latin America and Asia.

== History ==
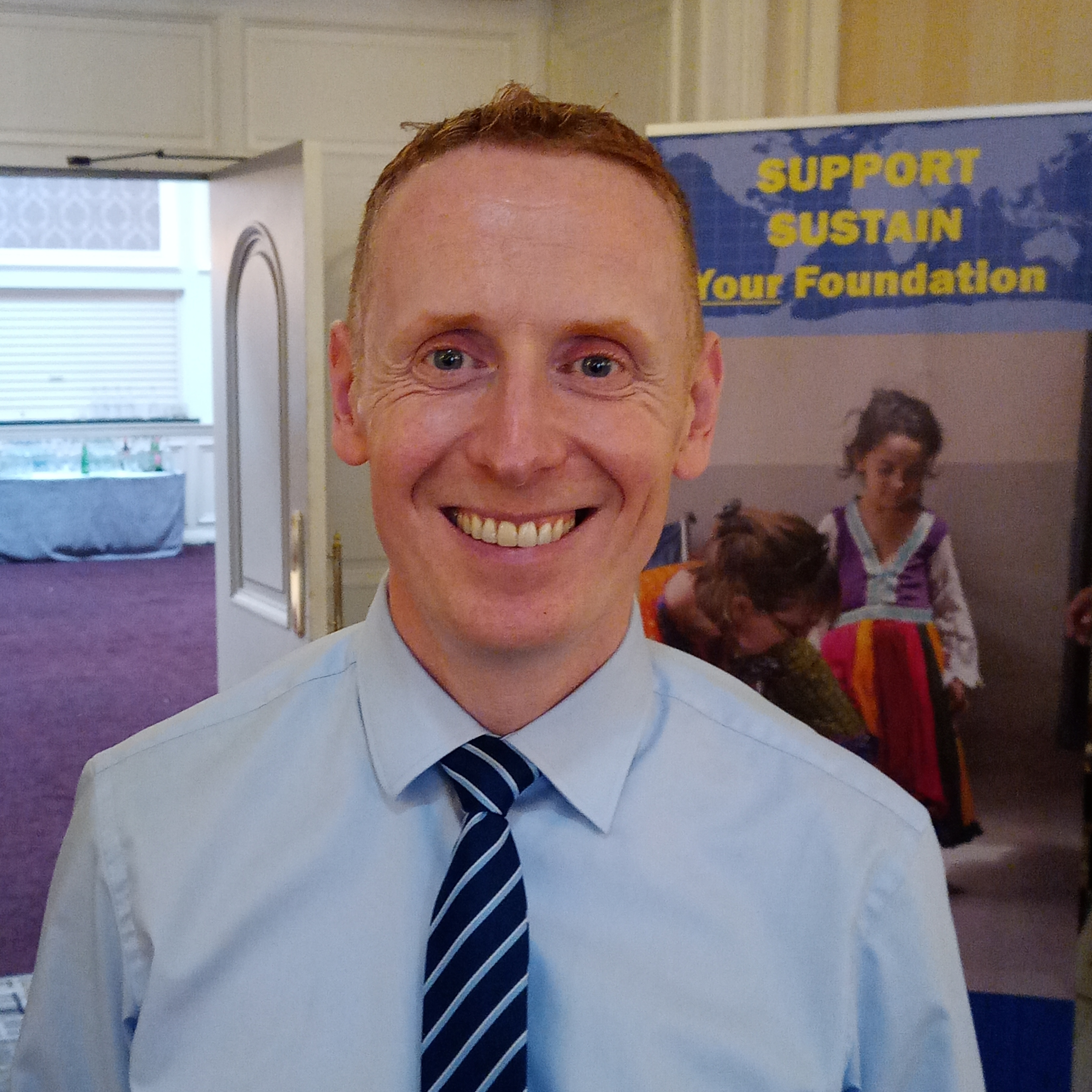
CEO David Cunningham during a talk to Rotary International in 2022

The charity was founded by Nicola and Garreth Wood and its base is in Edinburgh. Garreth had sold the Scottish hospitality firm Speratus Group he had created for $6m. Preventable problems like appendicitis and broken bones can result in death or blighted lives. The charity plans to install 120 operating theatres by 2030. They supply equipment that is intended to not require expensive maintenance and they also fund the training of anaesthetists and surgeons to staff the new facilities. In 2021 they estimated that they had improved the lives of 36,000 children.

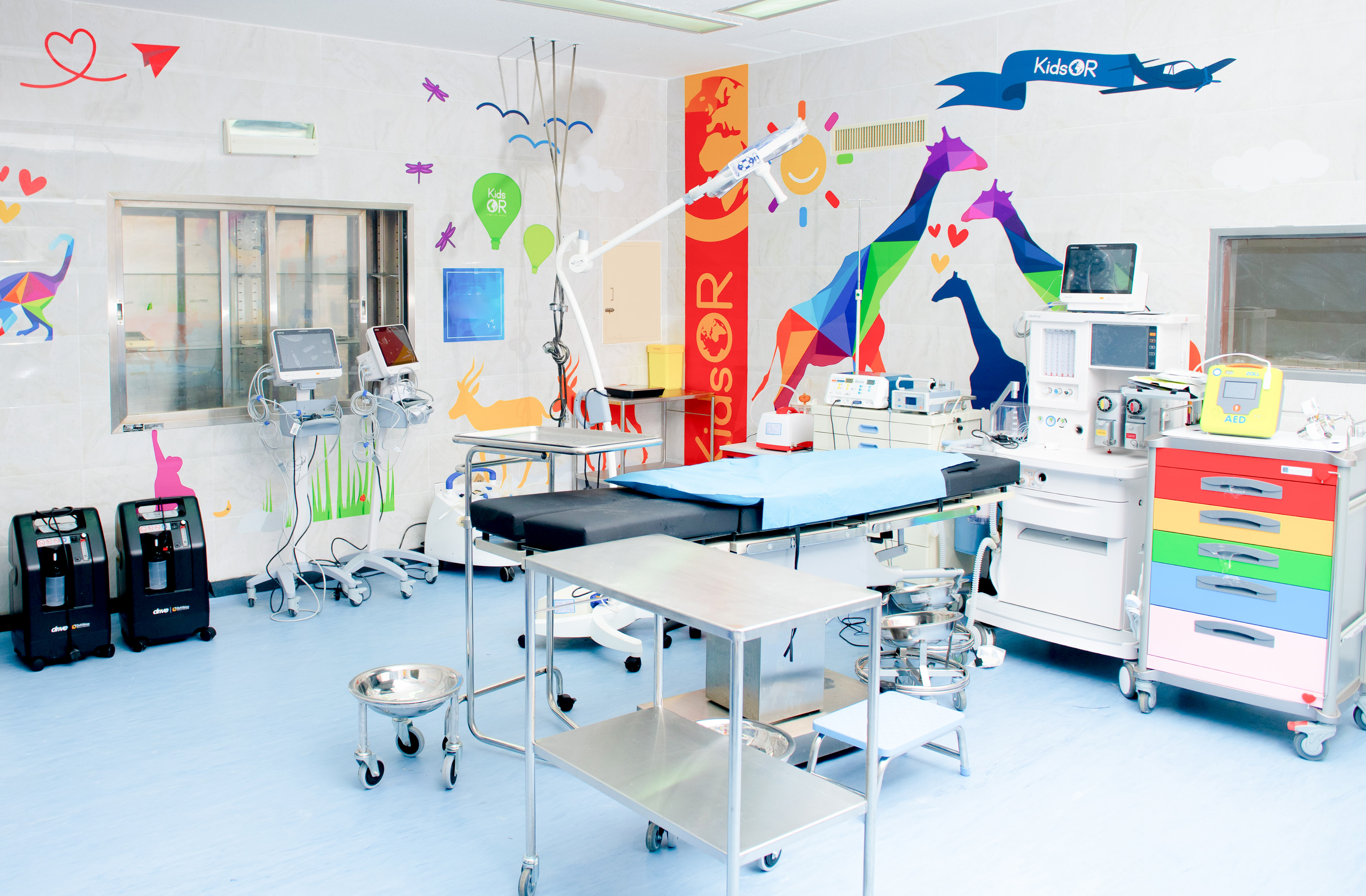
Zambia - Operating Room

One example is an operating theatre for children in the huge refugee camp in Kakuma in Kenya. It is said to be the first operating theatre for children in a refugee camp. Another example is in Kano in Nigeria where they have revamped a theatre in 2022 at the city's Armed Forces Specialist Hospital. They worked with the American charity Smile Train to revamp 30 operating theatres in Africa and this included three in Nigeria.

The charity has a large depot in Dundee where they put together the kits required to create a new operating theatre. This can consist of 3,000 different items.

In 2025 John Swinney who was Scotland's first minister went on a tour of Zambia and Malawi and he visited the facility in Zambia.

== Advocacy ==
The charity uses its position to note the work that goes on aboard and which they merely assist with. They highlighted anaesthesiologist Dr Chomba Jullien who works at the Arthur Davidson Hospital in Ndola in Zambia. She is unusual because she is a woman. Lack of role models and child care are two of her challenges.
