= Amadeus Quartet =

British string quartet active 1947–1987

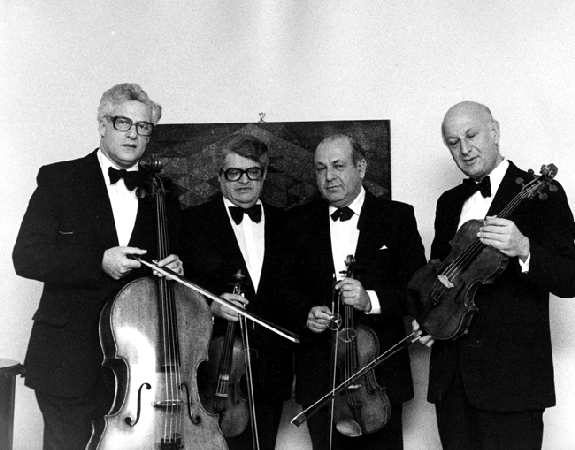
- left to right: Martin Lovett, Norbert Brainin, Siegmund Nissel, Peter Schidlof

Background information
- Also known as: Brainin Quartet
- Years active: 1947–1987
- Members: Norbert Brainin (violin); Siegmund Nissel (violin); Peter Schidlof (viola); Martin Lovett (cello)

The Amadeus Quartet was a string quartet founded in 1947 and disbanded in 1987, having retained its founding members throughout its history.

Noted for its smooth, sophisticated style, its seamless ensemble playing, and its sensitive interpretation, the quartet has often been seen as working within an Austrian tradition. However, it was formed and based in the United Kingdom.

== History ==
Because of their Jewish origin, the violinists Norbert Brainin (12 March 1923 – 10 April 2005), Siegmund Nissel (3 January 1922 – 21 May 2008) and Peter Schidlof (9 July 1922 – 16 August 1987; later violist) were driven out of Vienna after Hitler's Anschluss of 1938. Brainin and Schidlof met in a British internment camp at Prees Heath before being transferred to the Isle of Man; many Jewish refugees were confined by the British as "enemy aliens" upon seeking refuge in the UK. Brainin was released after a few months, but Schidlof remained in the camp, where he met Nissel. Finally Schidlof and Nissel were released, and the three of them were able to study with violin teacher Max Rostal, who taught them free of charge. It was through Rostal that they met cellist Martin Lovett (3 March 1927 – 29 April 2020), and in 1947 they formed the Brainin Quartet, which was renamed the Amadeus Quartet in 1948.

The group gave its first performance as the Amadeus Quartet at the Wigmore Hall in London on 10 January 1948, underwritten by British composer and conductor Imogen Holst. On 25 January 1983 the Quartet gave a 35th-anniversary concert in the same concert hall with a programme which included Beethoven's String Quartet in C major, Op. 59 No. 3 (3rd Rasumovsky Quartet). Touring extensively, the Amadeus performed throughout Europe, Canada, the United States, Japan, and South America.

The quartet made some 200 recordings, among them the complete quartets of Ludwig van Beethoven, Johannes Brahms, and Wolfgang Amadeus Mozart. For concerts as well as recordings of string quintets (Mozart, Franz Schubert, Johannes Brahms, Anton Bruckner) and string sextets (Brahms) they regularly invited Cecil Aronowitz as second viola and William Pleeth as second cello. Though they emphasized a standard Classical and Romantic repertory, they also performed works by such 20th-century composers as Béla Bartók, and Benjamin Britten who wrote his last string quartet expressly for them, which they premiered after his death.

== Awards ==
The Amadeus Quartet's members were awarded numerous honors, including:

- The Order of the British Empire, presented by the Queen.
- Doctorates from the Universities of London, York, and Caracas.
- The highest of all German awards, the Great Cross of Merit.
- Austrian Decoration for Science and Art.
- Grand Prix du Disque

The quartet disbanded in 1987 upon the death of the violist Peter Schidlof. When the quartet was founded in 1947, the four members decided that, if one of the musicians either left the quartet or died, he would not be replaced and the quartet would disband. Forty years later, true to their word, the quartet disbanded upon Schidlof's death (of a heart attack, at 65). Brainin died on 10 April 2005 and Nissel on 21 May 2008. The final member, Martin Lovett, died on 29 April 2020.
