= Luise Radlmeier =

German religious sister

Agonia Radlmeier, OP, (born as Luise Radlmeier in 1937 in Pfeffenhausen) was a German religious sister of the Dominican Missionary Sisters of the Sacred Heart of Jesus. She led a movement to care for the victims of the military conflicts in central Africa.

== Life ==
Radlmeier was born in Pfeffenhausen, Bavaria, in 1937. Through the talk of a missionary who reported on his work in Brazil, she became aware of the missions. She joined the congregation of the Dominican Missionary Sisters of the Sacred Heart of Jesus in Strahlfeld in 1956, where she served as a missionary in Zimbabwe and Kenya for over 60 years.

In 1957, Sr. Agonia was sent to Africa where she has worked with the Dominican missions in Zimbabwe, Zambia and Kenya. Several years later she returned briefly to Europe where she received a graduate degree at the Sorbonne before returning to Africa to teach religious studies.

In 1987, while teaching in Nairobi, Radlmeier's attention was drawn by the growing number of young refugees fleeing the Second Sudanese War who came to the Dominican Sisters' convent seeking relief. Drawn to their plight, she began to provide education for these refugees, placing them in local schools, as well as food and housing.

Radlmeier expanded her efforts by 1990, as young Sudanese fled to Nairobi from the desperate conditions in the refugee camp at Kakuma, nearly 700 kilometers to the north. She raised funds to provide hundreds with basic and vocational primary and secondary education. By the late 1990s, she was supporting the education of nearly 800 Sudanese each year.

In 2002, Radlmeier left her teaching position to tend full-time to the needs of young Sudanese refugees and begin building the Emmanuel Foundation. She currently runs the Emmanuel Foundation from her compound in Juja Kenya. The Emmanuel Foundation serves the neediest Kenyans and African war refugees. Their programs include several schools, dormitories, three homes for AIDS and war orphans, a working farm, a home for the elderly and a modest hospital. Radlmeier died on March 12, 2017, in Nairobi, Kenya, as a result of a fractured femur.

== Lost Boys and Girls of Sudan ==
By the late 1990s, Radlmeier had built a center in Juja, north of Nairobi, to receive young people from the increasingly desperate conditions at Kakuma, and to offer a refuge for children orphaned by the war. She began working with the Joint Voluntary Agency, operated by the Church World Service to prepare young Sudanese for the interviews that were necessary to establish their refugee status so they could emigrate to the US, Canada and Australia. Many of the Lost Boys of Sudan, as well as a handful of Lost Girls, who have been aided by Radlmeier are living around the world.

== Honors and awards ==
- In 2006, Radlmeier was awarded the Wallenberg Medal by the University of Michigan.
