= Siegmund Nissel =

Siegmund Nissel OBE
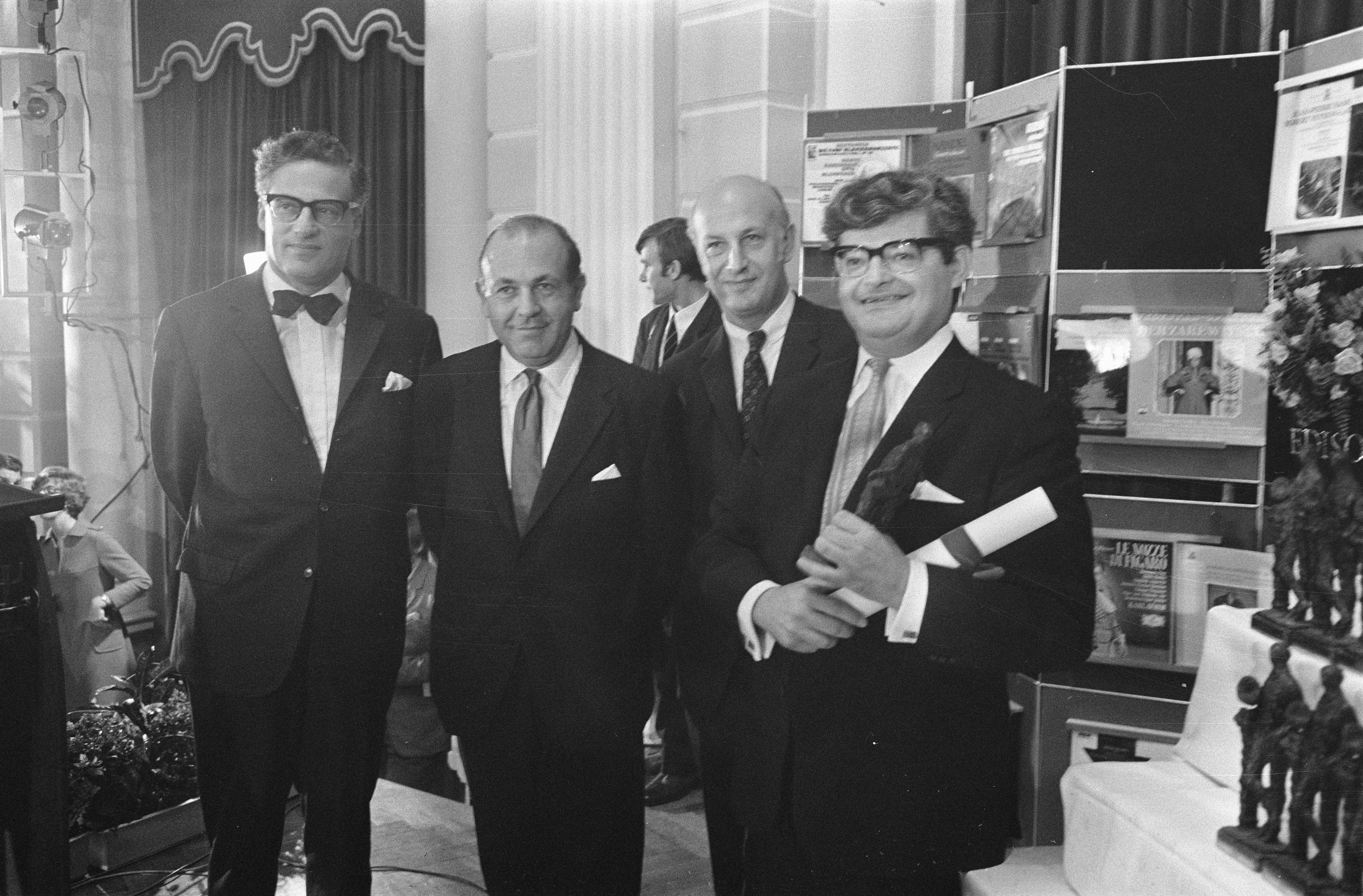
- Amadeus Quartet (1969) (Nissel 2nd left)
- Born: Siegmund Walter Nissel; 3 January 1922; Munich, Weimar Republic
- Died: 21 May 2008 (aged 86); London, England
- Organizations: Amadeus Quartet

Siegmund Walter "Sigi" Nissel OBE (3 January 1922 – 21 May 2008) was an Austrian-born British violinist who played second violin in the Amadeus Quartet and served as its administrator.

Sigi Nissel was born in Munich to a Jewish family from Vienna. He began playing the violin at the age of 6. His mother died when he was 9. He was taken by his father to Vienna, where his teachers included Max Weissgärber. Nissel was evacuated from Vienna in 1938 to Great Britain.

During World War II, Nissel was interned as a "friendly enemy alien" in Onchan Camp on the Isle of Man where he met the violist Peter Schidlof and later the violinist Norbert Brainin. With the British cellist, Martin Lovett, they would form the Amadeus Quartet.

The Amadeus Quartet, informally known as the Wolf Gang, gave its first concert in London in 1948. The Amadeus Quartet made some 200 recordings, among them the complete quartets of Beethoven, Brahms, and Mozart and works by 20th-century composers such as Béla Bartók and Benjamin Britten (who wrote his third quartet for them).

Nissel played the "Payne" Stradivarius of 1731.

He married the statistician Muriel Griffiths in 1957, and they had a daughter Claire and a son Daniel.

Following the death of Schidlof from a heart attack in 1987, the Amadeus Quartet disbanded. Nissel became a teacher of young quartets at the Royal Academy of Music, and died in London.
