= Norbert Brainin =

Norbert Brainin OBE
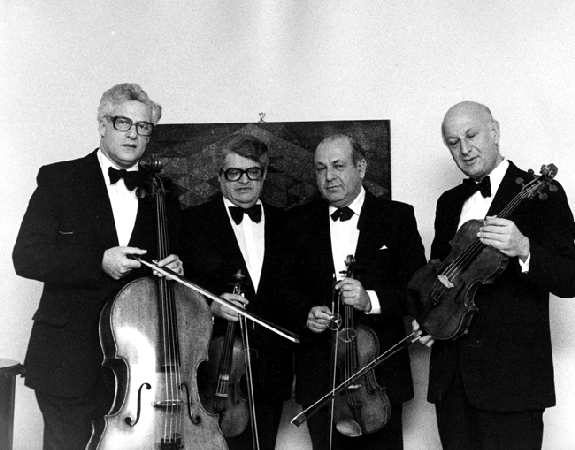
- Brainin (second from the left) with the Amadeus Quartet

Background information
- Born: 12 March 1923; Vienna, Austria
- Died: 10 April 2005 (aged 82) London, United Kingdom
- Genres: Classical
- Instrument: Violin
- Formerly of: Amadeus Quartet

Norbert Brainin OBE (12 March 1923 – 10 April 2005) was the first violinist of the Amadeus Quartet, one of the world's most highly regarded string quartets.

Because of Brainin's Jewish origin, he was driven out of Vienna after Hitler's Anschluß of 1938, as were Amadeus violinist Siegmund Nissel and violist Peter Schidlof. Brainin and Schidlof met in a British internment camp. Like many Jewish refugees, they had the misfortune of being confined by the British as "enemy aliens" after reaching the United Kingdom. Brainin was released after a few months, but Schidlof remained in the camp, where he met Nissel. Finally Schidlof and Nissel were released, and the three were able to study with violin pedagogue Max Rostal, who taught them free of charge. Brainin won the 1946 Carl Flesch International Violin Competition, which Rostal co-founded.

It was through Rostal that they met cellist Martin Lovett, and in 1947 they formed the Brainin Quartet, which was renamed the Amadeus Quartet in 1948. They became one of the most celebrated quartets of the 20th century; its members were awarded numerous honours, including:

- Officer of the Order of the British Empire, presented by the Queen (1960)
- Doctorates from the Universities of London, York, and Caracas
- The highest of all German awards, the Grand Cross of Merit
- The Austrian Cross of Honour for Science and Art (1974)

The quartet disbanded in 1987 on the death of Schidlof, whom the surviving members considered irreplaceable. Brainin continued to perform as a soloist, often with pianists Günter Ludwig and Maureen Jones. In 1992, he performed a benefit concert in Washington, D.C. for then-jailed presidential candidate Lyndon LaRouche.

His instruments included the "Rode" Guarnerius del Gesu of 1734, the "Chaconne" Stradivarius of 1725 and the "Gibson" Stradivarius of 1713.

== See also ==
- List of Austrians in music
- List of British Jewish entertainers
