= Brownkey Abdullahi =

Dadaab-born blogger and activist

- Born: Brownkey Abdullahi; 1993 (age 32–33); Dadaab refugee camp in Kenya.
- Organization: Brownkey Organization.
- Honours: Akili Dada Fellow.

Brownkey Abdullahi (born 1993) is an activist and blogger who was born to Somali parents in Dadaab refugee camp in Kenya. She is the founder of the Brownkey Organization.

== Early life ==
Abdullahi was born in early 1993 to Somali parents in Dagahaley refugee camp in Dadaab, Kenya. Her family fled the Somalia Civil War in 1991. She started school while aged three.

Abdullahi considers herself "Dadaabbian" neither Kenyan nor Somali.

== Activism ==
In 2013, Abdullahi started blogging, making her the first person to blog from Dadaab. Her blogging originally focused on countering negative rhetoric about Somali refugees before focusing on women's rights.

== Career ==
Abdullahi founded the Brownkey Organization, based in Dadaab, which advocates against female genital mutilation and gender based violence. In 2017, the foundation campaigned for better living conditions and for reform to camp policy.

== Awards ==
Abdullahi is an Akili Dada Fellow.
