= Neema Kaseje =

Pediatric surgeon and public health specialist

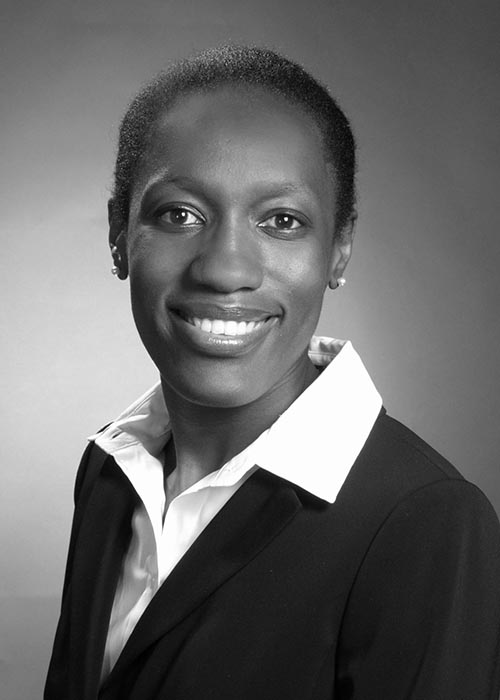
- Occupation: Pediatric surgeon

Academic background
- Education: B.S. Biology, 1999, Boston University; M.D., 2004, Boston University School of Medicine; M.P.H., 2008, Harvard T.H. Chan School of Public Health; DrPH, 2018, London School of Hygiene and Tropical Medicine

Neema Kaseje is an American pediatric surgeon and public health specialist in Boston, with Doctors Without Borders, and at University Hospitals Geneva. She is the founder and director of the Surgical Systems Research Group in Kisumu, Kenya. She has recently been appointed the head of the World Health Program in Emergency and Essential Surgical Care, and leads a Wellcome Trust funded COVID-19 health intervention in Siaya, Kenya.

== Early life and education ==
Neema Kaseje earned her Bachelor of Arts in Biology in 1999 from Boston University and her MD from Boston University School of Medicine in 2004. She received a master's degree in Public Health from the Harvard T.H. Chan School of Public Health in 2008. In 2018, she received a Doctorate in Public Health from the London School of Hygiene and Tropical Medicine. Kaseje started her medical career as a resident at the Boston Medical Center. She has been a Clinic Fellow at the Harvard Medical School Program in Global Surgery and Social Change in Boston and Haiti.

She was born in Boston and raised in Geneva, Switzerland and Kisumu, Kenya. She describes herself as always drawn to science. Her father is also a public health specialist who spent worked extensively in community based health, and this has influenced her work.

== Career ==
Neema Kaseje was part of the first set of physicians at the first paediatric surgical program in Liberia, run by Doctors Without Borders. She has worked on capacity building for pediatric surgical care in Haiti in partnership with Hopital Universitaire de Mirebalais. She leads the strategic support for a UBS Optimus funded project that aims to increase access to surgery in rural Nicaragua.

Kaseje's work in Western Kenya includes training community health workers to detect children who need surgical care. In Turkana, Kenya, she worked on maternal mortality by mobilizing local women leaders. In Siaya, Kenya, Kaseje has been heavily involved in COVID-19 response. The World Economic Forum has highlighted her as one of the six women heading COVID response in the world. In Siaya, her organization trained 1300 healthcare workers and digitized processes of data collection about cases to inform quicker responses. Her organization has built a network of mentorship groups that reach 800 young girls in Siaya to encourage school retention and reduce teenage pregnancies during the pandemic. Kaseje has also co-authored a paper assessing the rural county's basic COVID-19 preparedness. She is actively involved in the Global Initiative for Children's Surgery.

Recently, Kaseje has headed a hackathon with people under 30 from Africa with the intention of attracting and developing technological solutions to surgical problems.

Kaseje was named a Young Global Leader by the World Economic Forum in 2017 and the NaWuchs Prize by the Swiss Society for Pediatric Surgery.
