= Peter Schidlof =

Peter Schidlof OBE
- Peter Schidlof with the "MacDonald" Stradivarius of 1719

Background information
- Born: Hans Schidlof; 9 July 1922; Göllersdorf, Austria
- Died: 16 August 1987 (aged 65) Cumbria, England
- Genres: Classical
- Instrument: Viola
- Formerly of: Amadeus Quartet

Peter Schidlof OBE (born Hans Schidlof; 9 July 1922 – 16 August 1987) was an Austrian-British violist and co-founder of the Amadeus Quartet.

== Life and career ==
Born in Göllersdorf near Vienna, Schidlof fled Austria for England following the Nazi Anschluss in 1938. He left Austria in December 1938, together with his younger sister Ilse, as part of the Kindertransport programme. He won a scholarship to Blundell's School in Devon. Following the start of World War II in September 1939 and enactment of Defence Regulation 18B, he was interned in Onchan Internment Camp on the Isle of Man as an enemy alien. He was interned from August 1939 to April 1941. It was while he was interned that he first met Norbert Brainin and Siegmund Nissel. After years of internment, like Brainin and Nissel, Schidlof became a pupil of Max Rostal, and it was Rostal who became the mentor of the Amadeus and persuaded Schidlof, who had been a violinist, to become a viola player. With Martin Lovett as cellist, the Amadeus gave their first concert at the Wigmore Hall in 1948. Schidlof’s separate contribution to the Amadeus is difficult to assess, so much were the four a team, although his nickname "Eagle ears" shows his particular insistence on technical accuracy. His calm, questing manner and his close knowledge of a wide range of music beyond the chamber music repertory, combined with his cultivated and kind manner as a person, were an important part of the quartet's chemistry.

Schidlof's playing was noted for its warm, sensitive and rich tone. This was also clear in his solo playing away from the Amadeus. Brainin and he often came together for Mozart's Sinfonia Concertante. Schidlof performed solos on many occasions in Harold en Italie, where he characterised the solo part with a keen sense of Berliozian romanticism. He was always ready and willing to tackle contemporary work, and gave several premieres.

The quartet gave their first performance as the Amadeus Quartet in London on 10 January 1948. Touring extensively, the Amadeus performed throughout Europe, Canada, the United States, Japan, and South America. The quartet made some 200 recordings, among them the complete quartets of Ludwig van Beethoven, Johannes Brahms, and W.A. Mozart. Though they emphasized a standard Classical and Romantic repertory, they also performed works by such 20th-century composers as Béla Bartók and Benjamin Britten (who wrote his third quartet expressly for them). The group disbanded upon the death of Schidlof in 1987.

He played for many years on the "MacDonald" Stradivarius of 1701 as well as owning fine examples by Testore and Bergonzi.

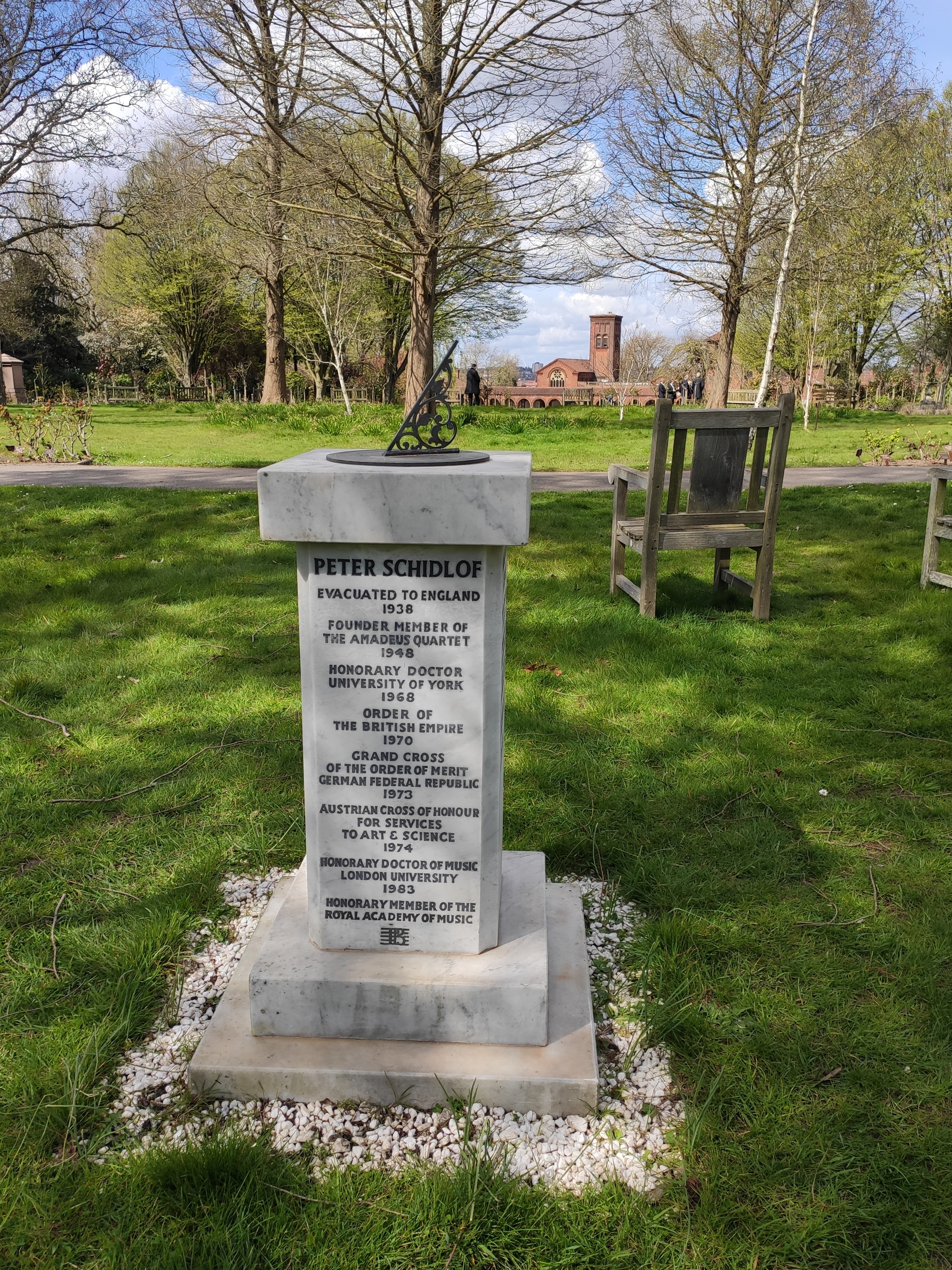
Pillar dedicated to Schidlof at Golders Green Crematorium

Schidlof died in 1987 in Cumbria, England. His ashes and those of his wife are interred in the gardens of Golders Green Crematorium, London.

== Awards and recognition ==
The Amadeus was one of the most celebrated quartets of the 20th century, and its members were awarded numerous honors, including:

- The Order of the British Empire, presented by the Queen.
- The highest of all German awards, the Federal Grand Cross of Merit.
- The Austrian Cross of Honour for Science and Art.
- Doctorates from the Universities of London, York, and Caracas.
