= Kakuma =

Town in Kenya

- Town
- Location in Kenya
- Coordinates: 03°43′N 34°52′E
- Country: Kenya
- County: Turkana County

Population
  - Total: 60,000

Kakuma is a town in northwestern Turkana County, Kenya. It is the site of a UNHCR refugee camp, established in 1992. The population of Kakuma town was 60,000 in 2014, having grown from around 8,000 in 1990. In 1991, the camp was established to host unaccompanied minors who had fled the war in Sudan, Somalia and from camps in Ethiopia. It was estimated that there were 12,000 "lost boys and girls" who had fled here via Egypt in 1990/91.

Kakuma is situated in the second poorest region in Kenya and as a result of this poverty, there are ongoing tensions between the refugees and the local community that has occasionally resulted in violence. Compared to the wider region, the Kakuma camp has better health facilities and a higher percentage of children in full-time education, which resulted in a general notion that the refugees were better off than the locals. The host community is composed largely of nomadic pastoralists who stick to their traditions and do not co-operate with refugees. Camp is becoming a normal part of the regional socio-economic landscape and a part of livelihood options available in the region. Kakuma is one of two large refugee camps in Kenya; the second and bigger one is Dadaab.

Malnutrition, communicable disease outbreaks, and malaria are all ongoing problems, while donor support has faltered due to conflicts in other parts of the world. Many people in Kakuma are long-term refugees, living in hopelessness and desperation. The situation is particularly bad for young people. Many of the refugees hope to leave Kakuma for third country resettlement in another country. For example, the "Lost Boys of Sudan" were a special group who were resettled from the camp to the United States.

== Climate ==
Semi-arid climate with average temperatures reaching 40 °C and only drop to the low 30's at night: dry and windswept, dust storms. Kakuma is wedged between two dry river-beds, and the occasional rain can lead to flooding.

The only plants that survive are thorny bushes and a few flat-topped trees. As agriculture is almost impossible this results in fierce competition among different local groups for ownership of cattle. Refugees are not allowed to keep animals, due to the potential for conflict between the refugees and the local Turkana people. This camp was made because of the Lost boys even though they were not all boys.

== Camp structure ==
The complex comprises four parts (Kakuma I-IV), and is managed by the Kenyan government and the Kenyan Department of Refugee Affairs in conjunction with the UNHCR. As of December 2020, the site hosts around 200,000 people, mostly refugees from the civil war in South Sudan.

Staff members are housed outside the camp in three large compounds with various amenities.

The 5pm curfew at the camp means no help available for refugees after 5pm. Don Bosco has special role in the camp because they are the only workers who can help refugees in emergency situations at night.

Each ethnic community occupies a separate and somewhat discrete location. Each neighbourhood built its own market stands, coffee shops, library, and places of worship.

=== Aid agencies ===
The International Rescue Committee (IRC) is responsible for health services in the camp, the Lutheran World Federation is responsible for providing primary education, early childhood development, child protection and sustainable livelihoods programs, the National Council of Churches of Kenya provides housing, the Jesuit Refugees Services provide education, Don Bosco, an Italian NGO, runs a vocational training centre; Rädda Barnen (Swedish Save the Children) has been the lead agency responsible for providing primary and some secondary education. FilmAid Kenya (https://filmaidkenya.org) is the core communication agency in the refugee operations, though it also serves the host communities in Kakuma and other parts of Turkana West sub-county. Working collaboratively with other agencies, FilmAid Kenya provides key messages in the areas of protection, education, health, water, sanitation, hygiene, food assistance and nutrition using such media as film, radio broadcasts, radio talk shows, mobile information caravan services, participatory educative theatre and FilmAid's Virtual Distribution Network (FVDN). ORAM (Organization for Refuge, Asylum & Migration) provides support to the LGBTQIA+ community within the camp.

For many years, the United States Agency for International Development was a major funder of humanitarian work at Kakuma. The cuts to USAID by the Trump Administration in 2025 caused starvation and despair in the Kakuma camp.

== Housing ==
New arrivals normally receive one piece of reinforced plastic 4 by 5 meters with which to construct their shelter. The plastic, while providing an excellent waterproof layer, is not self-supporting, nor does it provide any insulation. They need long supple pieces of wood to make the frame and grass to complete the shelter walls of the hut and provide some thermal insulation. Housing is built of mud brick, wood, or cane extracted from the surrounding territories and new or scavenged canvas. The other half is thatched roof huts, tents, and mud abodes.

== Food ==
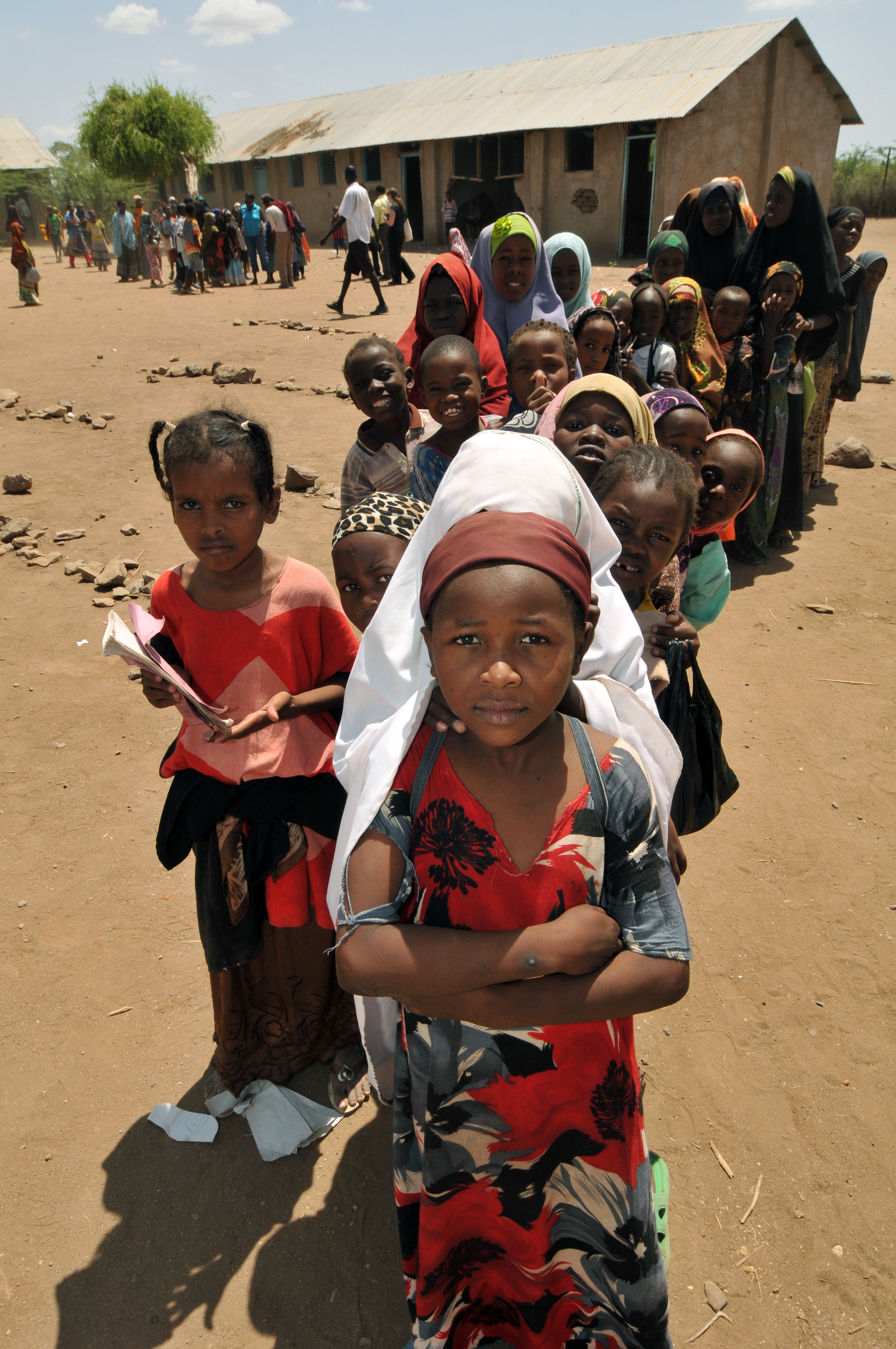
School children, 2011

Except for the tiny minority who were able to establish shops, the vast majority of the population of Kakuma is completely dependent on the food rations supplied for their survival. The World Food Programme (WFP) provides a food ration to all the refugees once a month based on the minimal dietary requirement of 2,100 calories/person/day. WFP is responsible for deciding the amount of food to be distributed and for providing it in the form of staples. In 2011, the WFP provided food to 98.3% of the registered refugees, averaging 2,076 calories/person/day.

The main problem with the food rations is that they do not necessarily provide the elements necessary for a basic diet. Furthermore, it is insensitive to cultural differences and household needs, leading to refugees considering food assistance as degrading – where they are expected to be grateful for inappropriate provisions. Moreover, when, as is frequent, WFP is unable to provide all of these staples, the calories are distributed through whatever commodity is available. There have been times when all of the 1900 calories (i.e. before it was increased to 2,100) were supplied in maize flour. In 1997, refugees had not received any beans or lentils for eight weeks, their only potential source of protein.

When the maize is too dry it needs to be milled/ground. Fuel is needed for transporting them to the mills for grinding the corn. Cash is inevitable to pay mills to grind the maize ration into flour (for porridge). When there is a firewood shortage (i.e. very regularly) the dried beans cannot be eaten as they cannot be cooked without firewood or other fuel. Cash is needed for buying coal and firewood (since violent clashes with local Turkana people nobody dares to collect firewood themselves). Through its agreement with WFP, UNHCR has accepted responsibility for providing additional foods which will supply the micro-nutrients. A large-scale micronutrient powder program targeting the entire population of the camp was initiated in February 2009 for 17 months.

WFP expects that refugees will trades some food received. A thriving ration resale market operated directly in front of one of the main food distribution centres. More often tolerated than not, ration resale periodically became the subject of active policing, including police sweeps that forced ration sellers to clear the area, particularly when these practices become too blatant and visible. Since the Turkana people do not have any food, they do odd jobs and buy maize and beans from refugees.

Since 2015, the WFP has introduced digital cash transfers, i.e. sends 100 KShi in cash per person/ month through a mobile phone to replace part of the food rations (10% of staple cereal like maize, wheat flour, or sorghum). The cash can only be redeemed for food. This gives refugees more freedom to decide what they will eat and is also good for the local economy.

== Security ==
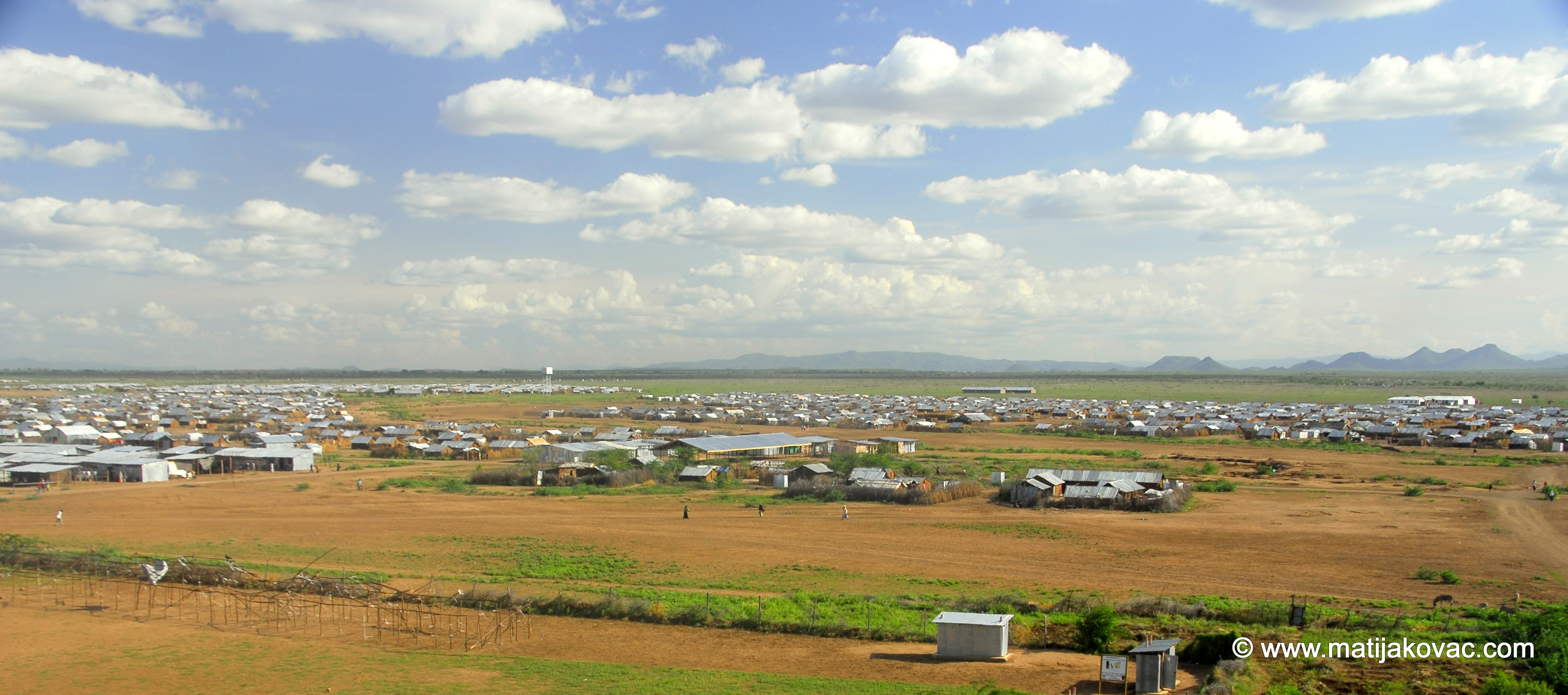
Kakuma Refugee Camp, block 2

There is a Kenyan police station located just outside the entrance of the camp. Kenyan police do not typically operate in the camp after dusk. Kenyan police sweep the major roads at dusk, requiring all non-refugees that they encounter to leave the camp. Within the camp, LWF has responsibility for security. LWF employ a number of Kenyans, mainly ex-military personnel who patrol the camp and all issues relating to security have to be reported to them. There is a 120-member force of local guards, drawn from both the refugee and local populations. 'Police stations' which are staffed around the clock and which provide a base for night-time patrols have been constructed. Refugee residents have their own guards and patrols after nightfall and in many of the residential groups, guards carry machetes and makeshift bows on their patrols. There is a Protection Area within the camp, which is a fenced enclosure accommodating around 120 families. It is intended as a temporary solution when a refugee's safety cannot be ensured in the camp, so almost no services are provided. As a result of several Turkana thefts and intrusions into domestic spaces inside the camp there is increased fencing especially along the edges of each residential group.

- In 2014 at least fourteen people have been killed in fighting between South Sudanese refugees: officials say the fighting, following the alleged rape of a young girl, has divided Dinka and Nuer residents against each other.
- There were collective punishments after enclosures built for distributing rations and counting refugees were destroyed by unidentified refugees (1994 and 1996). Because of that food distribution was cut off for 21 days and 14 days, respectively and the 'incentives' paid to employed refugees were withdrawn. After these tensions some refugee leaders were invited to a meeting with UNHCR representatives in the next bigger town (Lodwar). They attended believing it would provide an opportunity to sort out the misunderstandings between the refugees and the agencies. However these leaders were arrested, charged with incitement, destruction of property and theft of building materials. They spend two months in prison and the following court hearings had to be paid by the refugee community. They were acquitted for this charge but could not get compensation for being in prison because of UNHCRs jurisdictional immunity.

== Justice ==
In theory, Kenyan law applies to Kakuma camp. In practice, this seldom happens. It is not usual for the Kenyan police to intervene in camp security without having been specifically asked to do so by UNHCR. Refugees have been allowed to establish their own 'court' system which is funded by LWF. Community leaders preside over these courts and are allowed to pocket the fines they impose. Apart from fines there are punishments, including flogging and detention. Dinka community members (from South Sudan) tend to get stronger punishments. Refugees are left without legal remedies against abuses as they cannot appeal against their own courts.

== Education ==
The education coverage is: pre-primary 25%, primary education 65%, secondary education 2%. In 2014 there were: 7 pre-schools, 21 primary schools, 4 secondary schools (2 high schools and 2 technical colleges, where the Kenyan curriculum and Arabic courses are taught), numerous vocational training and other courses.

Cultural/traditional practices do not favour girl's education. Girls only represent 20% of pupils in primary and secondary schools, due to the prevalence of forced and early marriages. Some parents deny their daughters schooling due to fears they could learn about family planning, contraception and critical thinking skills. However, the girls themselves are partial to education, as they see it as a means to free themselves from familial oppression. There is a rule requiring boys and girls to eat together at school, which has encouraged the coeducational idea, in sharp contrast to traditional practice, particularly for the Sudanese.

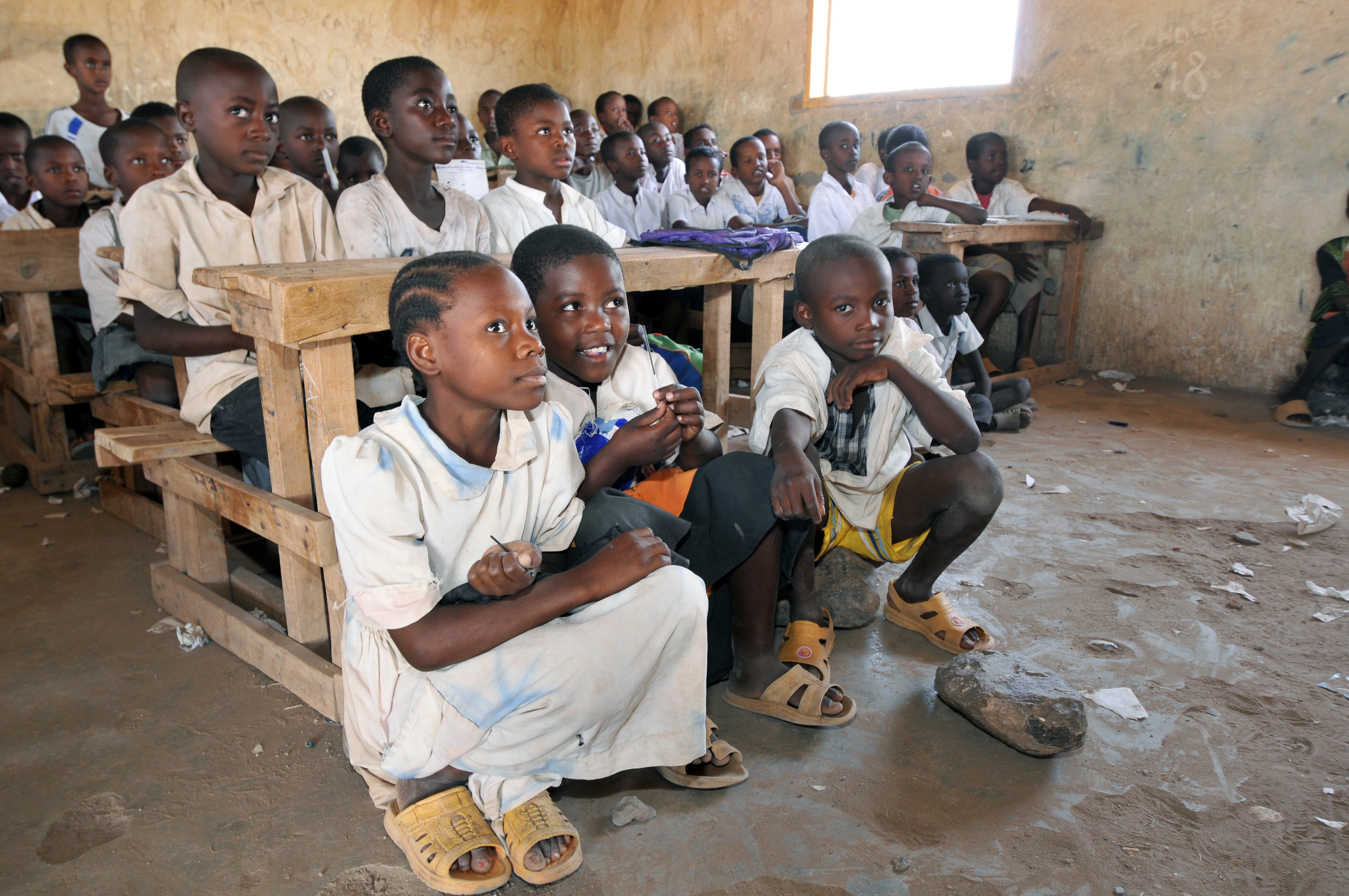
School children in Kakuma refugee camp

There are boarding schools dedicated solely to give girls a space to focus on learning. Angelina Jolie Girls Primary School, is an example of one, located far from the residences, which has helped reduce the number of girls dropping out due to pregnancy. Another example is Morneau Shepell High School, which was built in 2013, created to give girls the ability to solely focus on education. Depending on their performance, they are offered a chance to study at the University of Toronto after they graduate. These two schools show the support for girls education from all around the world.

Congestion in schools, dilapidated and underresourced facilities, and a lack of trained teachers. Some pupils have to walk up to 10 kilometres to school (one way). In 2003, the Kakuma Distance Learning Centre offered 29 students the possibility to take academic courses with the University of South Africa. As a form of entrepreneurship, refugees started schools and training centres for language and vocational skills, sometimes with Kenyan teachers or volunteers from the camp. The Instant Network Schools eLearning project was launched in a secondary school and a community library in 2015, which is a mobile solution that allows for interactive classes using mobile educational content.

== Health ==
There is a 90-bed main hospital with the possibility and practice of referral to other hospitals in Kenya, five satellite clinics with a total capacity of 520. In 1997, a community mental health service was established by IRC and UNHCR: slightly less than 1% of the camp population used it between 1997 and 1999. Data from a 2004 study reports that 38.6% of patients were diagnosed with PTSD. 22.7% were diagnosed with anxiety, 12.3% were diagnosed with psychosis, 10.6% with depression, and 6.9% with epilepsy.

In 2021 the first paediatric operating theatre was installed. It was said to be the first in any refugee camp anywhere. The theatre was organised by a Scottish organisation called KidsOR and the theatre has a capacity for 1,000 operations each year. 3,000 items were required to create it and a paedatric surgeon, Dr Neema Kaseje, trained the team who operate it.

== Work and income ==
Restrictions on employment deter refugee jobseeking. However, all NGOs in the camp 'employ' refugees, but due to Kenyan laws prohibiting employment of refugees, they are engaged on a voluntary basis and paid an "incentive", which is far lower than a wage would be for a Kenyan or international in an equivalent position.

Refugees who work for aid agencies are paid around $20–40 per month. The salaries of the local Kenyan or the international staff are 10 to 100 times higher (for the same jobs). For example, a refugee teacher was paid an 'incentive' of 3,000 KSh in contrast to Kenyan teachers who earned 12,000 KSh. $66,000 is paid to refugees per month in salaries and wages from employment in the humanitarian and commercial sectors. This practice is justified on the grounds that to pay refugees on par with others would require them to have a work permit issued by the Kenyan authorities.

Incentive staff represents only a small fraction of the refugee population. The work opportunities available from the UNHCR, the WFP or partner agencies usually consist of jobs involving physical labour (construction and security) or low-level clerical work, including bookkeeping and nursing. Incentives are vital to the survival of the population – they ensure that some money is injected into the camp economy. For many refugees, the attraction of these jobs is the enhanced and sustainable access to goods and services through proximity to the commercial and relief actors, rather than the immediate cash benefit. Jobs in the commercial sector pay marginally better wages, ranging from $100–200 per month. It is possible for refugees to start small businesses, if the capital is available. Local businessmen have to obtain a trading licence costing 1,970 KSh per year.

CARE International began running a credit facility which has since provided cash and materials to a wide range of income generating activities. The international remittances received by refugees total between $100,000 and $150,000 every month. Together with national remittances more than $200,000 flows into Kakuma every month. 20% of families receive remittances of on average $50 per month. 70 to 80% of the refugee population have access to cash through local employment and business activities (both estimated at $66,000), or remittances (estimated at $200,000 monthly). This group tends to sell up to 90% of their relief packages. They retain only a few items such as wheat flour, cooking oil, soap, and some of the lentils such as green grams. 20 to 30% of the population do not have any income and get money only through selling up to 50% of relief packages into the black market (estimated at $89,000). For selling 100% of the relief package an individual recipient might receive between 600-1200 KSh per month. The traders of the aid rations pay around $89,000 per month to the refugees for their overall sold rations. Depending on family size, refugees selling their relief rations realize between 600 KSh and 4,000 KSh a month, cash that is used to buy goods from the camp stores.

== Economy ==
The Kakuma camp hosts more than 500 retail and wholesale shops. It has various markets, mostly organized according to ethnicity, where a wide variety of products are on sale, such as fresh and canned food items, vegetables, meat, clothing, household items, hardware, medicine, cosmetics, building equipment, electrical equipment, such as radios and telephones, and bicycles.

There is a service sector with restaurants, coffee and tea shops, bars, pool halls, laundries and businesses offering telephone, banking, electronic repairs and maintenance, education, computing and internet services. The main market has more than 120 stalls, with video clubs, hardware stores, a post office which relays Kenyan mail, and so-called 'hotels' which are coffee shops where locally brewed beer is served.

At the market in Kakuma town (outside the camp), refugees come to sell their food rations at very low prices. Some traders specialize in buying up food rations from the refugees in small quantities and selling it in large quantities to merchants outside the camp. Most of the local retailers have been ruined by the competition with refugees. Goods sold in the camp are very cheap because refugees do not pay tax, rent, food, health care or education for their children. Still, taking formal and informal economy together the monthly turnover in the camp is $300,000 to $400,000. Taxation in the camp would yield more than two million Kenyan Shillings. However, the market is finite, since Kakuma is in a very isolated area.

== Threatened closure in 2016 ==
In 2016, the Kenyan government announced it would close Kakuma as well as the refugee camp at Dadaab. The government said it had already disbanded its Department of Refugee Affairs as part of the move. Principal Secretary of the Ministry of Interior Karanja Kibicho declared, "Due to Kenya's national security interest, the government has decided that hosting of refugees has to come to an end. The government acknowledges that this decision will have adverse effects on the lives of refugees but Kenya will no longer be hosting them". The camp was still in existence in 2022.

== Notable residents ==
- Halima Aden, model
- Adut Akech, supermodel
- Aliir Aliir, AFL player
- Yiech Biel, runner
- Handwalla Bwana, professional footballer
- James Chiengjiek, runner
- Rose Nathike Lokonyen, Olympic runner
- Lopez Lomong, runner
- Awer Mabil, Australian footballer
- Tokmac Chol Nguen, Norwegian footballer
- Valentino Yuel, professional footballer
- Mary Maker, UNHCR Goodwill Ambassador
- Duop Reath, Professional basketball player
