= Akuch Kuol Anyieth =

South Sudanese writer

Akuch Kuol Anyieth (born 1991 or 1992) is a South Sudanese-Australian academic and writer.

Anyieth was born in South Sudan. During violence between the Nuer and Dinka tribes, her mother moved the family to Kakuma refugee camp in Kenya, when Anyieth was aged five years. She later moved to, and studied in, Australia. In 2022 she published her memoir Unknown: A Refugee’s Story and was given a Victorian Refugee Award.

== Early life ==
Anyieth was born to a Dinka family in South Sudan to mother Mary Achol Anyuon and mechanical engineer father Kuol Anyieth. Her oldest sister Atong was born in the village of Mar, in 1988, during the Second Sudanese Civil War, and her eldest sister is Ajok was born prior in Khartoum. Her mother had three more siblings, Deng, Yom and Thon who all died young, before giving birth to Akuch, just as war broke out between Nuer and Dinka tribes. To escape the conflict, the family moved to Kidepo, in Eastern Equatoria, where her mother gave birth to her brother, Gai, and her father joined the Sudan People's Liberation Army. In 1995, when Akuch Kuol Anyieth was five years old, her mother fled South Sudan with most of her siblings (excluding Ajok who was already married and living in a different refugee camp), to Kakuma refugee camp in Kenya via Lokichogio, arriving in Kakuma in 1996.

Anyieth was aged 31 in May 2022.

== Education ==
Anyieth has a bachelor's degree in legal studies from La Trobe University in Melbourne and a master's degree of justice and criminology from the Royal Melbourne Institute of Technology.

She is currently working on a PhD about family violence in Australia's South Sudanese community, emphasising masculinity, migration experience and South Sudanese Customary law.

== Adult life ==
=== Memoir ===
Her memoir Unknown: A Refugee’s Story was published in 2022 by Text Publishing and includes themes of forced migration and family violence.

Book reviewer, Steve Dow, writing in The Guardian, praised Anyieth for her unflinching honesty as she described her experience of family violence. Her book documents Anyieth's journey, and her perceptions about the Australian media reporting about African men and how they are over-policed in Australia.

=== Awards and recognition ===
In 2022, Anyieth was awarded a Victorian Refugee Award. She was inducted onto the Victorian Honour Roll of Women in 2023 and was shortlisted for the 2023 National Biography Award for Unknown.
