= Atem Kuol Atem =

South Sudanese basketball player

Atem Atem
Personal information
- Born: 24 December 1991 (age 34) Bor, South Sudan
- Listed height: 203 cm (6 ft 8 in)

Career information
- High school: Illawarra Sports (Wollongong, New South Wales)
- Playing career: 2014–2023
- Position: Forward

Career history
- 2014: Ipswich Force
- 2014–2015: Adelaide 36ers
- 2015: Eastern Mavericks
- 2016: North-West Tasmania Thunder
- 2017: Goldfields Giants
- 2018: North Adelaide Rockets
- 2019: Shepparton Gators
- 2020: South West Metro Pirates
- 2021–2022: Northside Wizards
- 2023: Ipswich Force

Career highlights
- NBL1 North champion (2023)

Atem Kuol Atem Bol (born 24 December 1991) is a South Sudanese former basketball player.

== Early life ==
Atem was born in Bor, South Sudan. He and his family spent four years in the Kakuma refugee camp in Kenya before moving to Sydney, Australia, where he was introduced to basketball by his high school teacher. He started to take the sport seriously when he was offered a scholarship to Illawarra Sports High School in Wollongong, and from there he earned a scholarship to Northern Oklahoma College in the United States. Atem was on the 2012–13 roster at North Oklahoma College, but he was forced to redshirt the season, which made him re-think his commitment and ultimately led to him deciding not to return to the program for the 2013–14 season.

== Career in the Australian state leagues ==
Atem made his Australian state league debut in 2014, playing five games for the Ipswich Force in the Queensland Basketball League (QBL). He was named MVP of the Force's second-tier team.

Atem joined the Adelaide 36ers as a development player for the 2014–15 NBL season. He participated in the team's preseason exhibition matches and made one appearance during the season. He remained in South Australia for the 2015 Premier League season, where he played for the Eastern Mavericks. He continued on with the 36ers for the 2015–16 NBL season as a member of the team's training squad.

In November 2015, Atem signed with the North-West Tasmania Thunder of the South East Australian Basketball League (SEABL) for the 2016 season. In 20 games for the Thunder, he averaged 2.5 points and 1.3 rebounds per game.

On 31 October 2016, Atem signed with the Goldfields Giants of the State Basketball League (SBL) for the 2017 season. In 23 games for the Giants, he averaged 5.0 points and 4.1 rebounds per game.

In December 2017, Atem signed with the North Adelaide Rockets for the 2018 season, returning to the Premier League for a second stint. In 18 games, he averaged 13.2 points, 7.4 rebounds and 1.0 assists per game.

In March 2019, Atem signed with the Shepparton Gators of the Big V Division One. In 27 games, he averaged 19.37 points, 9.89 rebounds and 1.11 assists per game.

In 2020, Atem played for the South West Metro Pirates in the Queensland State League (QSL).

In March 2021, Atem signed with the Northside Wizards of the NBL1 North for the 2021 NBL1 season. In 12 games, he averaged 13.33 points, 6.0 rebounds and 1.41 assists per game.

In April 2022, Atem re-signed with the Wizards for the 2022 NBL1 North season. In 15 games, he averaged 4.6 points and 2.5 rebounds per game.

Atem joined the Ipswich Force for the 2023 NBL1 North season. In nine games, he averaged 6.11 points and 3.78 rebounds per game. He was a member of the Force's extended squad when they won the NBL1 North championship and then played for the team during the 2023 NBL1 National Finals.

== National team ==
In March 2017, Atem played for the South Sudanese national team at the FIBA AfroBasket 2017 qualifiers. In four games, he averaged 9.8 points and 9.3 rebounds per game.
