= Hans-Georg Maaßen =

German civil servant and lawyer (born 1962)

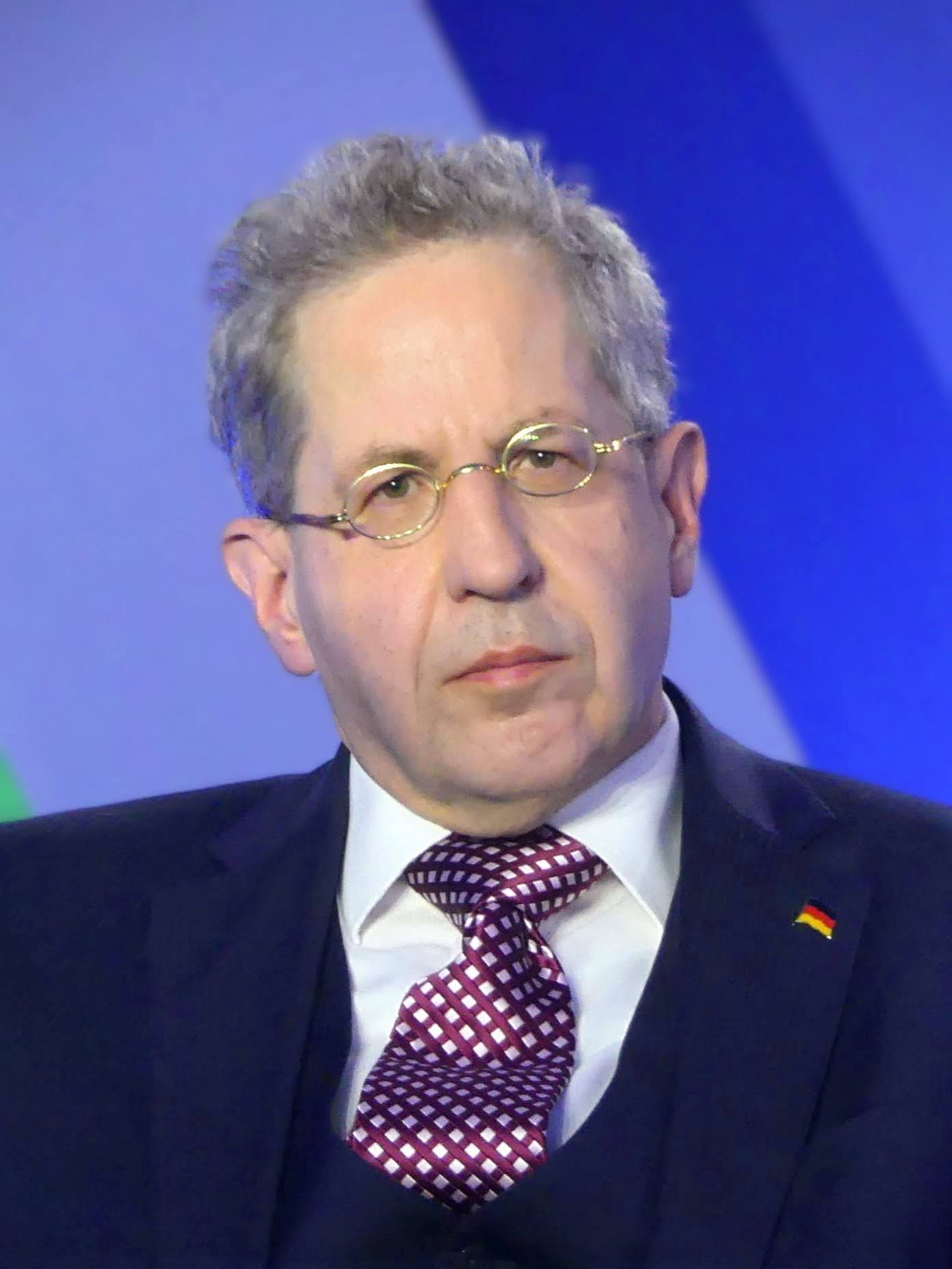
- Maaßen in 2023

President of the Federal Office for the Protection of the Constitution
- In office 1 August 2012 – 8 November 2018
- President: Joachim Gauck; Frank-Walter Steinmeier
- Chancellor: Angela Merkel
- Deputy: Ernst Stehl; Thomas Haldenwang
- Preceded by: Heinz Fromm
- Succeeded by: Thomas Haldenwang

Personal details
- Born: Hans-Georg Maaßen; 24 November 1962 (age 63) Rheindahlen, West Germany
- Party: Independent
- Other political affiliations: Values Union (2024–2025) CDU (1978–2024)
- Spouse: Yuko Maaßen
- Education: University of Cologne
- Occupation: Lawyer; civil servant; politician

Hans-Georg Maaßen (born 24 November 1962) is a German civil servant and lawyer. From 1 August 2012 to 8 November 2018, he served as the President of the Federal Office for the Protection of the Constitution, Germany's domestic security agency and one of three agencies in the German Intelligence Community. He was removed from his Federal role in 2018 after controversial comments exonerating far-right violence, and feeding unpublished intelligence reports to the AfD. He would subsequently claim he was the victim of a far-left conspiracy, but admit in 2025 that characterizations of the AfD as a far-right extremist organization were accurate.

In 2021 Maaßen was selected as a candidate of the Christian Democratic Union (CDU). He is one of the founders and, since January 2023 also president, of the Values Union, a German registered association, converted in 2024 to a political party, that consists mostly of more conservative members of the CDU.

== Life and career ==
Maaßen was born on 24 November 1962 in Mönchengladbach. He joined the Christian Democratic Union (CDU) at age 16. He studied Law, writing a PhD thesis on the legal status of asylum seekers in International Law.

In 1991, he began working at Germany's Interior Ministry. On 18 July 2012, Maaßen was appointed by the Cabinet of Germany to take over from Heinz Fromm as President of the Federal Office for the Protection of the Constitution. Several months later, he was sworn in to this post. On 18 September 2018, an agreement was made to promote Maaßen to a role within the Interior Ministry and relieve him of his previous duties once a successor for his post has been agreed on. However, after various statements critical of the German government, he was instead placed in "early retirement" on 8 November 2018.

In April 2021, Maaßen was selected as the CDU's candidate for the constituency of Suhl – Schmalkalden-Meiningen – Hildburghausen – Sonneberg in the 2021 German federal election. He was defeated by Social Democrat Frank Ullrich.

== Controversy ==
=== 2013 mass surveillance disclosures ===
During the 2013 mass surveillance disclosures, German media reported that Maaßen visited the headquarters of the U.S. National Security Agency (NSA) in January and May. According to classified documents of the German government, Maaßen had agreed to transfer all data collected by the Federal Office for the Protection of the Constitution via XKeyscore to the NSA.

=== Edward Snowden comments ===
In June 2016, he questioned whether Edward Snowden was working for Russian intelligence, and Snowden sent a sarcastic response in German:

Ob Maaßen Agent des SVR oder FSB ist, kann derzeit nicht belegt werden. (Whether Maaßen is an agent of the SVR or FSB [two Russian security services] cannot currently be determined.)

Cooperation with the FSB had also been suggested by Oleg Kalugin, at least since Snowden's arrival in Russia.

=== Chemnitz protests and retirement ===
After the 2018 Chemnitz protests, for several weeks politics and the media focused on a video where a black-clad man comes out of an angry mob and briefly runs after another man. Some sources claim that the chased person is of Afghan heritage.

In response to the video, Maaßen caused controversy as some sources claim that an angry mob had "hunted" foreign-looking people. In an interview with Bild, Maaßen questioned whether there was any credible evidence for such "hunts", and stated that his security agency had in fact not seen any such evidence. Maaßen offered no reason for questioning the widely accepted narrative of what had happened in Chemnitz.

Maaßen's statements, which seemed to undermine the credibility of the media and political institutions such as the one he represented, led to calls for his dismissal across the political spectrum (excluding the AfD). After Maaßen had been asked to explain his behaviour to a parliamentary committee, the SPD called on Angela Merkel to dismiss Maaßen immediately. This move could have escalated to a crisis within the Fourth Merkel cabinet since the responsible minister, Interior Minister Horst Seehofer, continued to back Maaßen over the row. In attempt to resolve the situation, on 18 September 2018 an agreement was reached to move Maaßen from his role as President of the Federal Office for the Protection of the Constitution to a role as state secretary in Seehofer's ministry. According to media reports this new position would have been on a higher pay grade. However, this proposed solution caused further outrage among the German public and members of the SPD, who did not accept what would effectively be a promotion for Maaßen. A renegotiation within the government ended on 23 September 2018 with an announcement that Maaßen would now be an "advisor" in the interior ministry, and no longer be receiving a pay rise.

Shortly after the Chemnitz controversy, Maaßen caused yet another scandal with his departure speech from the Federal Office for the Protection of the Constitution. According to a copy of this speech leaked to the public in early November 2018, in it Maaßen presented himself as the victim of a conspiracy of "radical left-wing" forces in the German government against him, due to his criticism of the government's "naive", "left-wing" security and migration policies. On 5 November, as a result, Interior Minister Horst Seehofer concluded that a trusting relationship with Maaßen was no longer possible, asking president Frank-Walter Steinmeier to place him in early retirement.

=== Radicalisation ===
After departing from the BfV, Maaßen radicalised, increasingly using far-right terminology about "globalism", a "New World Order", and the "Great Reset". In 2019, he told Swiss newspaper Neue Zuercher Zeitung that the term conspiracy theory had been "invented by certain foreign intelligence services" in order to "discredit political opponents." He described public health measures in Germany against the COVID-19 pandemic the "most serious human rights crimes we have experienced".

In an investigation of a December 2022 far-right plot to storm the Bundestag and install a new Reich, security forces found text messages between Maaßen and members of the leadership of the Reichsbuerger movement, including one that said: "We have to keep fighting." He collaborated with the Austrian conspiracy theory website AUF1 and the YouTube channel Hallo Meinung as well as appearing on RT Deutsch.

=== CDU: Bundestag candidature and expulsion ===
Maaßen's selection as a CDU candidate for the 2021 federal election was met with controversy both within and outside the party. The Greens and SPD were both critical of the decision, while CDU official Serap Güler and state minister Karin Prien both expressed outrage. Prien described Maaßen as a "marginal actor on the democratic spectrum, with whom most Christian Democrats have little in common." Party secretary Paul Ziemiak stated that the party expects "clear differentation from the AfD" from its candidates. Maaßen stated he sought to win over voters from the Alternative for Germany, as well as protest voters and non-voters.

In July, the non-governmental organization Campact announced a campaign to prevent Maaßen from being elected. Maaßen was defeated in the direct mandate election for the Thuringian constituency of Suhl – Schmalkalden-Meiningen – Hildburghausen – Sonneberg by Social Democrat Frank Ullrich. As he was not on the CDU party list in Thuringia, he thus failed to be elected to the Bundestag.

In January 2023, he tweeted that the direction of "the driving forces in the political media sphere" is "eliminatory racism against whites and the burning desire for Germany to kick the bucket." As a result, the CDU unanimously approved a resolution calling for him to quit the party and in an interview discussed "a green-leftist race theory" that casts "whites as inferior" and promotes "immigration by Arabic and African men". CDU leader Friedrich Merz said: "His language and the body of thought that he expresses with it have no place in the CDU. The limit has been reached." Maaßen responded: "What I said wasn't racist, but what many people think. I reject ideological positions that demand the extinction of 'whitebreads' - those with white skin colour - through mass immigration."

=== Under investigation ===
In early 2024, Maaßen revealed that he was under investigation by the BfV. He accused the interior minister Nancy Faeser of using intelligence services against political opponents. The BfV described his apparent belief in far-right and antisemitic conspiracy theories, anti-migrant rhetoric and sympathy for the far-right Reichsbürger movement as reasons for the investigation. Maaßen filed a complaint against the BfV in April 2024, forcing the service to deliver exerpts from its findings to Maaßens lawyers in mid 2025 to prove an anti-constitutional stance. The BfV documents focused on Maaßen deeming US president Joe Biden as apparently unfit for office in an interview in July 2024, with Maaßen asking who was actually in charge in the USA. This was interpreted as spreading conspiracy theories by the BfV analysts. That same month, Biden withdrew his candidacy for reelection, amid health concerns.

== Values Union ==
Maaßen was an important figure behind the Values Union (German: WerteUnion), a German registered association.

The Values Union was founded in 2017 and mostly included the CDU members seeking to reestablish their party's conservative roots. The CDU's executive committee did not recognize the Values Union as a party subdivision. The critics accused the Union of being close to Alternative for Germany (AfD). Quite small at the time group argued against Angela Merkel's approaches to euro rescue and the 2015 European migrant crisis. Maaßen refused to rule out potential coalitions with AfD in the medium-term. The 2019 resolution of the presidium and executive committee of the CDU related to the murder of Walter Lübcke indirectly accused Maaßen and the Values Union of complicity: "Anyone who supports the AfD must know that they are poisoning the social climate and brutalizing the political discourse". At the time statements by the CDU leadership could have been interpreted as supporting expulsion of Maaßen from the party.

Maaßen was elected president of the Values Union in January 2023, after Max Otte stepped down from the role on agreeing to run as the AfD candidate for German president in 2022. The federal leadership of the CDU initiated Maaßen's expulsion in February 2023. In the beginning of 2024, Maaßen announced a vote among the association members in order to turn the Values Union into a political party that would take an anti-immigration course.

Maaßen left the party in October 2025 due to internal conflicts and poor recent election results.
