= Donata Vogtschmidt =

German politician (born 1998)

- Donata Vogtschmidt in 2025

Member of the Bundestag for Thuringia
- Incumbent
- Assumed office 2025

Member of the Landtag of Thuringia
- In office 2021–2025

Personal details
- Born: 24 February 1998 (age 28) Koblenz, Germany
- Party: Die Linke
- Education: University of Erfurt

Donata Katharina Rebecca Vogtschmidt (born 24 February 1998) is a German politician from Die Linke. She was a member of the Landtag of Thuringia from 2021 to 2024. In the 2025 German federal election she was elected to the 21st German Bundestag via her party's state list.

== Life ==
Donata Vogtschmidt graduated from the Elisabeth-Gymnasium in Eisenach and served as student representative there. During her school career, she also served as press spokesperson for the chair of the Thuringian State Student Council and as a delegate of the Free State of Thuringia to the Federal Student Conference. Between 2016 and 2020, she studied political science with a focus on social and economic sciences at the University of Erfurt, graduating with a Bachelor of Arts.

Vogtschmidt is the mother of a daughter.

== Political career ==
During her involvement in higher education politics, Vogtschmidt held various positions in the Student Council of the University of Erfurt during several legislative periods, such as head of the University Policy Department and both as a freelance employee and as an elected member. In addition, she was elected and re-elected spokesperson for the Conference of Thuringian Student Unions (KTS) in January 2017, until she stepped down from the office in September 2020 after almost four years. She was also a student member of the Municipal University and Student Advisory Council of Erfurt. for five years until October 2021, and chaired the committee for four years during this time. In terms of content, she played a leading role in the development and introduction of the cultural semester ticket for Erfurt students and in the design of the university location development concept.

In May 2019, she ran for Arnstadt City Council and narrowly missed being elected by a few votes. Since then, she has served as an appointed citizen of the Left Party (Die Linke) in the municipal committee for youth, sports, and social affairs and was previously also a member of the municipal working group "Stadtgrün" (Urban Green).

In the 2019 Thuringian state election, she ran as a direct candidate in the Ilm-Kreis II constituency and lost to the AfD candidate Olaf Kießling. After the 2021 German federal election, she succeeded Susanne Hennig-Wellsow, who was elected to the German Bundestag, in the Landtag of Thuringia. In her parliamentary group, she was spokesperson for civil protection and fire services. As a permanent member, she served on the Committee on Internal Affairs and Local Government, the Subcommittee on Local Financial Equalization, and the Constitutional Committee of the Thuringian Landtag. Vogtschmidt maintained parliamentary offices in Arnstadt and Sondershausen.

Even before her mandated work in parliament, Vogtschmidt was involved in the issue of nuclear waste disposal. In cooperation with Ralph Lenkert, Member of the Bundestag and environmental policy spokesperson for the Left Party parliamentary group, she organized several events on the status quo of the current process at the federal level and on citizen participation in Arnstadt and Thuringia. She was therefore also the contact person for nuclear waste disposal in the Thuringian parliamentary group.

In the 2024 Thuringian state election, Vogtschmidt ran as a direct candidate in the Kyffhäuserkreis I – Eichsfeld III constituency and finished third with 11.3% of the vote, behind Stefan Schard (CDU; 42.0%) and Robert Teske (AfD; 36.6%). She thus failed to secure re-election to the Thuringian Landtag.

In the 2025 German federal election, she ran as a direct candidate in Eichsfeld – Nordhausen – Kyffhäuserkreis and won 11.9% of the first vote. She was elected on the state list. Her ultimately successful candidacy in the 2025 federal election was supported by Brand New Bundestag.

In terms of party politics, she is a member of the state and district executive committee of the Left Party in Thuringia and the Ilm district and, as spokesperson for the state working group “Left Women’s Network”, she is particularly dedicated to the topics of gender equality, feminism and political education.

Vogtschmidt is a member of the Education and Science Workers' Union.
