= Kyffhäuserkreis I – Eichsfeld III =

German electoral district

Kyffhäuserkreis I – Eichsfeld III is an electoral constituency (German: Wahlkreis) represented in the Landtag of Thuringia. It elects one member via first-past-the-post voting. Under the current constituency numbering system, it is designated as constituency 10. It covers the western part of Kyffhäuserkreis and a small part of Eichsfeld district.

Kyffhäuserkreis I – Eichsfeld III was created for the 1994 state election. Since 2019, it has been represented by Stefan Schard of the Christian Democratic Union (CDU).

== Geography ==
As of the 2019 state election, Kyffhäuserkreis I – Eichsfeld III covers the western part of Kyffhäuserkreis and a small part of Eichsfeld district, specifically the municipalities of Abtsbessingen, Bellstedt, Clingen, Ebeleben, Freienbessingen, Greußen, Großenehrich, Helbedündorf, Holzsußra, Niederbösa, Oberbösa, Rockstedt, Sondershausen, Thüringenhausen, Topfstedt, Trebra, Wasserthaleben, Westgreußen, and Wolferschwenda (from Kyffhäuserkreis), and Niederorschel (only Deuna, Gerterode und Vollenborn) from Eichsfeld.

== Members ==
The constituency has been held by the Christian Democratic Union since its creation in 1994. Its first representative was Günter Grüner, who served from 1994 to 2009, followed by Gerold Wucherpfennig (2009–2014), Manfred Scherer (2014–2019), and Stefan Schard (2019–present).

Election	Member	Party	%
1994	Günter Grüner	CDU	41.1
1999	Günter Grüner	CDU	45.4
2004	Günter Grüner	CDU	39.4
2009	Gerold Wucherpfennig	CDU	35.8
2014	Manfred Scherer	CDU	35.1
2019	Stefan Schard	CDU	34.4
2024	Stefan Schard	CDU	42.0

== Election results ==
=== 2024 election ===
State election (2024): Kyffhäuserkreis I – Eichsfeld III
Notes:	Blue background denotes the winner of the electorate vote. Pink background denotes a candidate elected from their party list. Yellow background denotes an electorate win by a list member, or other incumbent. A ✓ or ✗ denotes status of any incumbent, win or lose respectively.						
Party	Candidate	Votes	%	±%	Party votes	%	±%
CDU	✓ Stefan Schard	8,453	42.0	▲7.6	4,803	23.7	▲1.1
AfD	Robert Teske	7,364	36.6	▲13.5	7,248	35.7	▲12.8
BSW					3,511	17.3	
Left	Donata Vogtschmidt	2,279	11.3	▼11.6	2,449	12.1	▼20.2
SPD	Alexandra Wallrodt	1,328	6.6	▼4.2	1,175	5.8	▼3.0
Independent	Ralf Köhler	272	1.4				
FDP	Leon-Rob Diekneite	233	1.2	▼2.6	170	0.8	▼3.4
Greens	Jürgen Rauschenbach	198	1.0	▼1.9	216	1.1	▼1.7
APT					188	0.9	▼0.2
FW					180	0.9	
Familie					113	0.6	
BD					69	0.3	
Values					56	0.3	
Pirates					53	0.3	Steady
ÖDP					31	0.2	▼0.1
MLPD					16	0.1	▼0.2
Informal votes		343			192		
Total valid votes		20,127			20,278		
Turnout		20,470	70.3	▲10.2			
CDU hold	Majority	1,089	5.4	▼5.9			

=== 2019 election ===
State election (2019): Kyffhäuserkreis I – Eichsfeld III
Notes:	Blue background denotes the winner of the electorate vote. Pink background denotes a candidate elected from their party list. Yellow background denotes an electorate win by a list member, or other incumbent. A ✓ or ✗ denotes status of any incumbent, win or lose respectively.						
Party	Candidate	Votes	%	±%	Party votes	%	±%
CDU	Stefan Schard	6,505	34.4	▼0.7	4,281	22.6	▼6.3
AfD	Ralf Köhler	4,369	23.1		4,346	22.9	▲13.1
Left	Iris Martin-Gehl	4,324	22.9	▼9.0	6,124	32.3	▲2.0
SPD	Dorothea Marx	2,049	10.8	▼10.0	1,671	8.8	▼7.7
FDP	Fred Degenhardt	716	3.8		789	4.2	▲1.9
Greens	Babett Pfefferlein (Note: Pfefferlein entered the Landtag on the Greens list after the resignation of Dirk Adams in March 2020.)	547	2.9	▼2.0	535	2.8	▼0.9
Free Voters	Daniel Müler	407	2.2				
List-only parties					1,194	6.3	
Informal votes		345			322		
Total valid votes		18,917			18,940		
Turnout		19,262	60.1	▲8.3			
CDU hold	Majority	2,136	11.3	▲8.1			

=== 2014 election ===
State election (2014): Kyffhäuserkreis I – Eichsfeld III
Notes:	Blue background denotes the winner of the electorate vote. Pink background denotes a candidate elected from their party list. Yellow background denotes an electorate win by a list member, or other incumbent. A ✓ or ✗ denotes status of any incumbent, win or lose respectively.						
Party	Candidate	Votes	%	±%	Party votes	%	±%
CDU	Manfred Scherer	5,746	35.1	▼0.7	4,766	28.9	▼1.0
Left	Beatrice Ritzke	5,212	31.9	▲0.3	5,000	30.3	0.0
SPD	Dorothea Marx	3,404	20.8	▲0.2	2,722	16.5	▼4.1
AfD					1,611	9.8	
NPD	Patrick Weber	1,184	7.2	▲2.2	896	5.4	▲1.0
Greens	Babett Pfefferlein (Note: Pfefferlein entered the Landtag on the Greens list after the resignation of Olaf Möller in January 2015.)	804	4.9	▼2.1	617	3.7	▼1.0
List-only parties					888	5.3	
Informal votes		425			275		
Total valid votes		16,350			16,500		
Turnout		16,775	51.8	▼2.7			
CDU hold	Majority	534	3.2	▼1.0			

=== 2009 election ===
State election (2009): Kyffhäuserkreis I – Eichsfeld III
Notes:	Blue background denotes the winner of the electorate vote. Pink background denotes a candidate elected from their party list. Yellow background denotes an electorate win by a list member, or other incumbent. A ✓ or ✗ denotes status of any incumbent, win or lose respectively.						
Party	Candidate	Votes	%	±%	Party votes	%	±%
CDU	Gerold Wucherpfennig	6,642	35.8	▼3.6	5,595	29.9	▼12.6
Left	Beatrice Ritzker	5,871	31.6	▲2.6	5,667	30.3	▲2.9
SPD	Dorothea Marx	3,826	20.6	▲2.3	3,860	20.6	▲5.4
FDP					1,302	7.0	▲3.7
Greens	Babett Pfefferlein	1,300	7.0	▲3.3	878	4.7	▲2.1
NPD	Patrick Weber	924	5.0	0.0	833	4.4	▲0.4
List-only parties					590	3.2	
Informal votes		512			350		
Total valid votes		18,563			18,725		
Turnout		19,075	54.5	▲0.5			
CDU hold	Majority	771	4.2	▼6.2			

=== 2004 election ===
State election (2004): Kyffhäuserkreis I – Eichsfeld III
Notes:	Blue background denotes the winner of the electorate vote. Pink background denotes a candidate elected from their party list. Yellow background denotes an electorate win by a list member, or other incumbent. A ✓ or ✗ denotes status of any incumbent, win or lose respectively.						
Party	Candidate	Votes	%	±%	Party votes	%	±%
CDU	✓ Günter Grüner	7,447	39.4	▼6.0	8,056	42.5	▼5.4
PDS	Ralf Petersen	5,472	29.0	▲4.5	5,198	27.4	▲3.8
SPD	Cornelia Kraffzick	3,451	18.3	▼5.8	2,876	15.2	▼6.0
NPD	Patrick Weber	943	5.0		761	4.0	▲3.9
FDP	Patrick Kurth	877	4.6	▲3.2	634	3.3	▲2.5
Greens	Jürgen Rauschenbach	690	3.7		497	2.6	▲1.7
List-only parties					925	4.9	
Informal votes		960			893		
Total valid votes		18,880			18,947		
Turnout		19,840	54.0	▼4.7			
CDU hold	Majority	1,975	10.4	▼10.5			

=== 1999 election ===
State election (1999): Kyffhäuserkreis I – Eichsfeld III
Notes:	Blue background denotes the winner of the electorate vote. Pink background denotes a candidate elected from their party list. Yellow background denotes an electorate win by a list member, or other incumbent. A ✓ or ✗ denotes status of any incumbent, win or lose respectively.						
Party	Candidate	Votes	%	±%	Party votes	%	±%
CDU	✓ Günter Grüner	9,781	45.4	▲4.3	10,369	47.9	▲5.0
PDS		5,292	24.5	▲6.8	5,100	23.6	▲6.8
SPD		5,193	24.1	▼8.6	4,586	21.2	▼10.6
VIBT		581	2.7		293	1.4	
REP		419	1.9		145	0.7	▼0.5
FDP		291	1.3	▼1.4	178	0.8	▼1.7
List-only parties					973	4.5	
Informal votes		396			309		
Total valid votes		21,557			21,644		
Turnout		21,953	58.7	▼15.8			
CDU hold	Majority	4,489	20.9	▲12.5			

=== 1994 election ===
State election (1994): Kyffhäuserkreis I – Eichsfeld III
Notes:	Blue background denotes the winner of the electorate vote. Pink background denotes a candidate elected from their party list. Yellow background denotes an electorate win by a list member, or other incumbent. A ✓ or ✗ denotes status of any incumbent, win or lose respectively.						
Party	Candidate	Votes	%	±%	Party votes	%	±%
CDU	Günter Grüner	11,195	41.1		11,749	42.9	
SPD		8,892	32.7		8,687	31.7	
PDS		4,815	17.7		4,586	16.8	
Greens		1,564	5.7		981	3.6	
FDP		750	2.8		687	2.5	
List-only parties					688	2.5	
Informal votes		932			770		
Total valid votes		27,216			27,378		
Turnout		28,148	74.6				
CDU win new seat	Majority	2,303	8.4				
