= Suhl – Schmalkalden-Meiningen – Hildburghausen – Sonneberg =

Constituency in the German Bundestag

195 Suhl – Schmalkalden-Meiningen – Hildburghausen – Sonneberg
- Electoral district for the Bundestag
- Suhl – Schmalkalden-Meiningen – Hildburghausen – Sonneberg in 2025
- State: Thuringia
- Population: 282,600 (2019)
- Electorate: 230,071 (2021)
- Major settlements: Suhl; Meiningen; Sonneberg
- Area: 2,792.1 km^{2}

Current electoral district
- Created: 1990
- Party: AfD
- Member: Robert Teske
- Elected: 2025

Suhl – Schmalkalden-Meiningen – Hildburghausen – Sonneberg is an electoral constituency (German: Wahlkreis) represented in the Bundestag. It elects one member via first-past-the-post voting. Under the current constituency numbering system, it is designated as constituency 195. It is located in southwestern Thuringia, comprising the city of Suhl and the districts of Hildburghausen, Schmalkalden-Meiningen, and Sonneberg. The constituency is almost exactly coterminous with the Bezirk Suhl of East Germany.

Suhl – Schmalkalden-Meiningen – Hildburghausen – Sonneberg was created for the inaugural 1990 federal election after German reunification. From 2021 to 2025, it was represented by Frank Ullrich of the Social Democratic Party (SPD). Since 2025 it has been represented by Robert Teske of the AfD.

== Geography ==
Suhl – Schmalkalden-Meiningen – Hildburghausen – Sonneberg is located in southwestern Thuringia. As of the 2021 federal election, it comprises the independent city of Suhl and the districts of Hildburghausen, Schmalkalden-Meiningen, and Sonneberg.

== History ==
Suhl – Schmalkalden-Meiningen – Hildburghausen – Sonneberg was created after German reunification in 1990, then known as Suhl – Schmalkalden – Ilmenau – Neuhaus. In the 2002 through 2013 elections, it was named Suhl – Schmalkalden-Meiningen – Hildburghausen. It acquired its current name in the 2017 election. In the 1990 through 1998 elections, it was constituency 307 in the numbering system. In the 2002 election, it was number 199. In the 2005 election, it was number 198. In the 2009 and 2013 elections, it was number 197. In the 2017 and 2021 elections, it was number 196. From the 2025 election, it has been number 195.

Originally, the constituency comprised the city of Suhl and the districts of Landkreis Suhl, Schmalkalden, Ilmenau, and Neuhaus. In a 1994 district reform, most of these districts were merged. From 2002 through 2013, it comprised the city of Suhl and the new districts of Schmalkalden-Meiningen and Hildburghausen. It acquired its current borders in the 2017 election, adding the small southern district of Sonneberg.

Election	No.	Name	Borders
1990	307	Suhl – Schmalkalden – Ilmenau – Neuhaus	Suhl city; Landkreis Suhl district; Schmalkalden district; Ilmenau district; Neuhaus district
1994	307	Suhl – Schmalkalden – Ilmenau – Neuhaus	Suhl city; Landkreis Suhl district; Schmalkalden district; Ilmenau district; Neuhaus district
1998	307	Suhl – Schmalkalden – Ilmenau – Neuhaus	Suhl city; Landkreis Suhl district; Schmalkalden district; Ilmenau district; Neuhaus district
2002	199	Suhl – Schmalkalden-Meiningen – Hildburghausen	Suhl city; Hildburghausen district; Schmalkalden-Meiningen district
2005	198	Suhl – Schmalkalden-Meiningen – Hildburghausen	Suhl city; Hildburghausen district; Schmalkalden-Meiningen district
2009	197	Suhl – Schmalkalden-Meiningen – Hildburghausen	Suhl city; Hildburghausen district; Schmalkalden-Meiningen district
2013	197	Suhl – Schmalkalden-Meiningen – Hildburghausen	Suhl city; Hildburghausen district; Schmalkalden-Meiningen district
2017	196	Suhl – Schmalkalden-Meiningen – Hildburghausen – Sonneberg	Suhl city; Hildburghausen district; Schmalkalden-Meiningen district; Sonneberg district
2021	196	Suhl – Schmalkalden-Meiningen – Hildburghausen – Sonneberg	Suhl city; Hildburghausen district; Schmalkalden-Meiningen district; Sonneberg district
2025	195	Suhl – Schmalkalden-Meiningen – Hildburghausen – Sonneberg	Suhl city; Hildburghausen district; Schmalkalden-Meiningen district; Sonneberg district

== Members ==
The constituency was first represented by Claudia Nolte of the Christian Democratic Union (CDU) from 1990 to 1998. Iris Gleicke of the Social Democratic Party (SPD) was representative from 1998 to 2009. Jens Petermann of The Left was elected in 2009 and served a single term. Mark Hauptmann of the CDU was elected in 2013 and re-elected in 2017. Frank Ullrich won the constituency for the SPD in 2021. Ullrich's win was widely watched, as he beat controversial former Office for the Protection of the Constitution President Hans-Georg Maaßen.

Election	Member	Party	%
1990	Claudia Nolte	CDU	42.6
1994	Claudia Nolte	CDU	44.9
1998	Iris Gleicke	SPD	33.6
2002	Iris Gleicke	SPD	35.6
2005	Iris Gleicke	SPD	30.4
2009	Jens Petermann	LINKE	32.2
2013	Mark Hauptmann	CDU	42.0
2017	Mark Hauptmann	CDU	33.6
2021	Frank Ullrich	SPD	33.6
2025	Robert Teske	AfD	42.1

== Election results ==
=== 2025 election ===
Federal election (2025): Suhl – Schmalkalden-Meiningen – Hildburghausen – Sonneberg
Notes:	Blue background denotes the winner of the electorate vote. Pink background denotes a candidate elected from their party list. Yellow background denotes an electorate win by a list member, or other incumbent. A ✓ or ✗ denotes status of any incumbent, win or lose respectively.						
Party	Candidate	Votes	%	±%	Party votes	%	±%
AfD	Robert Teske	73,609	42.1	▲20.9	75,405	43.1	▲16.7
CDU	Erik Thürmer	33,940	19.4	▼2.9	30,596	17.5	▲1.0
Left	Philipp Weltzien	18,445	10.5	▲2.2	21,952	12.5	▲1.6
SPD	Raimund Meß	18,315	10.5	▼23.1	14,606	8.3	▼16.8
BSW	Thomas Schröder	14,683	8.4	New	17,694	10.1	New
FW	Andreas Hummel	6,139	3.5	▲0.6	4,459	2.5	0.0
FDP	Gerald Ullrich	4,205	2.4	▼3.9	4,547	2.6	▼5.7
Greens	Manfred Kröber	2,829	1.6	▼0.5	4,334	2.5	▼1.8
Independent	Andreas Papst	1,894	1.1	New			
Volt					632	0.4	▲0.2
Independent	Christian Horn	484	0.3	New			
BD					438	0.3	New
MLPD	Andreas Eifler	317	0.2	▼0.1	320	0.2	0.0
Informal votes		1,392			1,269		
Total valid votes		174,860			174,983		
Turnout		176,252	80.1	▲5.8			
AfD gain from SPD	Majority	39,669	22.7	N/A			

=== 2021 election ===
Federal election (2021): Suhl – Schmalkalden-Meiningen – Hildburghausen – Sonneberg
Notes:	Blue background denotes the winner of the electorate vote. Pink background denotes a candidate elected from their party list. Yellow background denotes an electorate win by a list member, or other incumbent. A ✓ or ✗ denotes status of any incumbent, win or lose respectively.						
Party	Candidate	Votes	%	±%	Party votes	%	±%
SPD	Frank Ullrich	56,791	33.6	▲20.1	42,446	25.1	▲11.5
CDU	Hans-Georg Maaßen	37,729	22.3	▼11.2	27,923	16.5	▼13.8
AfD	Jürgen Treutler	35,887	21.2	▼1.7	44,572	26.4	▲3.3
Left	Sandro Witt	14,135	8.4	▼9.8	18,486	10.9	▼6.0
FDP	Gerald Ullrich	10,686	6.3	▲1.5	13,990	8.3	▲1.5
FW	Detlef Pappe	4,898	2.9	▲0.6	4,247	2.5	▲0.8
Greens	Stephanie Erben	3,615	2.1	▼0.5	7,221	4.3	▲1.0
dieBasis					2,508	1.5	
Tierschutzpartei					2,232	1.3	
PARTEI	Christian Fichtner	2,247	1.3		1,859	1.1	▼0.1
Pirates	Christian Horn	1,313	0.8	▲0.1	1,078	0.6	▲0.2
ÖDP	Stefan Schellenberg	848	0.5	▼0.6	547	0.3	▼0.3
NPD					496	0.3	▼0.8
Menschliche Welt					416	0.2	
MLPD	Andreas Eifler	443	0.3	▼0.1	353	0.2	0.0
Independent	Marko Bieling	371	0.2				
Volt					264	0.2	
Team Todenhöfer					231	0.1	
Humanists					136	0.1	
V-Partei3					120	0.1	▼0.1
Informal votes		2,146			1,983		
Total valid votes		168,962			169,125		
Turnout		171,108	74.4	▲1.8			
SPD gain from CDU	Majority	19,062	11.3				

=== 2017 election ===
Federal election (2017): Suhl – Schmalkalden-Meiningen – Hildburghausen – Sonneberg
Notes:	Blue background denotes the winner of the electorate vote. Pink background denotes a candidate elected from their party list. Yellow background denotes an electorate win by a list member, or other incumbent. A ✓ or ✗ denotes status of any incumbent, win or lose respectively.						
Party	Candidate	Votes	%	±%	Party votes	%	±%
CDU	✓ Mark Hauptmann	56,316	33.5	▼8.3	50,956	30.3	▼9.1
AfD	Torsten Ludwig	38,351	22.8		38,693	23.0	▲17.9
Left	Steffen Harzer	30,646	18.3	▼9.3	28,467	16.9	▼8.3
SPD	Christoph Zimmermann	22,579	13.5	▼4.9	22,826	13.6	▼2.8
FDP	Gerald Ullrich	8,147	4.9	▲3.4	11,298	6.7	▲4.3
Greens	Roberto Kobelt	4,408	2.6	▼0.3	5,559	3.3	▼0.5
FW	Michael Schüler	3,823	2.3	▲1.0	2,867	1.7	▲0.3
PARTEI					2,041	1.2	
NPD					1,835	1.1	▼2.2
ÖDP	Martin Truckenbrodt	1,822	1.1		1,029	0.6	▲0.1
Pirates	Christian Horn	1,176	0.7	▼1.5	743	0.4	▼1.6
BGE					594	0.4	
DM					511	0.3	
MLPD	Andreas Eifler	604	0.4	▲0.2	349	0.2	0.0
V-Partei³					330	0.2	
Informal votes		2,365			2,139		
Total valid votes		167,872			168,098		
Turnout		170,237	72.6	▲6.4			
CDU hold	Majority	17,965	10.7	▼4.0			

=== 2013 election ===
Federal election (2013): Suhl – Schmalkalden-Meiningen – Hildburghausen
Notes:	Blue background denotes the winner of the electorate vote. Pink background denotes a candidate elected from their party list. Yellow background denotes an electorate win by a list member, or other incumbent. A ✓ or ✗ denotes status of any incumbent, win or lose respectively.						
Party	Candidate	Votes	%	±%	Party votes	%	±%
CDU	Mark Hauptmann	53,979	42.0	▲11.2	51,060	39.7	▲9.9
Left	✗ Jens Petermann	35,147	27.3	▼4.8	32,147	25.0	▼6.7
SPD	Iris Gleicke	23,519	18.3	▼2.7	20,968	17.6	▼1.3
AfD					6,557	5.1	
NPD	Tobias Kammler	4,772	3.7	▲0.3	4,048	3.1	▲0.1
Greens	Simone Maaß	3,704	2.9	▼1.7	5,105	4.0	▼1.3
Pirates	Bernd Schreiner	3,586	2.8		2,603	2.0	▼0.4
FW	Thoralf Quent	2,033	1.6		1,971	1.5	
FDP	Frank Fiedler	1,792	1.4	▼6.6	3,113	2.4	▼7.0
ÖDP					665	0.5	▲0.2
REP					303	0.2	▼0.2
MLPD					154	0.1	0.0
Informal votes		2,099			1,937		
Total valid votes		128,532			128,694		
Turnout		130,631	66.6	▲3.6			
CDU gain from Left	Majority	18,832	14.7				

=== 2009 election ===
Federal election (2009): Suhl – Schmalkalden-Meiningen – Hildburghausen
Notes:	Blue background denotes the winner of the electorate vote. Pink background denotes a candidate elected from their party list. Yellow background denotes an electorate win by a list member, or other incumbent. A ✓ or ✗ denotes status of any incumbent, win or lose respectively.						
Party	Candidate	Votes	%	±%	Party votes	%	±%
Left	Jens Petermann	41,361	32.2	▲3.3	40,815	31.7	▲3.9
CDU	Alexander Kästner	39,600	30.8	▲3.8	38,338	29.7	▲5.0
SPD	✗ Iris Gleicke	27,055	21.0	▼9.4	22,682	17.6	▼12.7
FDP	Lutz Recknagel	10,313	8.0	▲2.8	12,118	9.4	▲1.6
Greens	Simone Maaß	5,936	4.6	▲1.4	6,762	5.2	▲1.3
NPD	Hendrik Heller	4,380	3.4	▼0.3	3,941	3.1	▼0.5
Pirates					3,109	2.4	
REP					532	0.4	▼0.4
ÖDP					414	0.3	
MLPD					185	0.1	▼0.3
Informal votes		1,857			1,606		
Total valid votes		128,645			128,896		
Turnout		130,502	63.0	▼11.0			
Left gain from SPD	Majority	1,761	1.4				

=== 2005 election ===
Federal election (2005):Suhl – Schmalkalden-Meiningen – Hildburghausen
Notes:	Blue background denotes the winner of the electorate vote. Pink background denotes a candidate elected from their party list. Yellow background denotes an electorate win by a list member, or other incumbent. A ✓ or ✗ denotes status of any incumbent, win or lose respectively.						
Party	Candidate	Votes	%	±%	Party votes	%	±%
SPD	✓ Iris Gleicke	47,046	30.4	▼5.2	46,986	30.3	▼9.4
Left	Steffen Harzer	44,753	28.9	▲3.8	43,073	27.8	▲8.9
CDU	Marcus Kalkhake	41,833	27.0	▼4.9	38,376	24.7	▼4.8
FDP	Lutz Recknagel	8,108	5.2	▲0.4	12,068	7.8	▲2.3
NPD	Kurt Hoppe	5,780	3.7		5,462	3.5	▲2.8
Greens	Kurt Töpfer	4,981	3.2	▲0.7	6,149	4.0	▲0.4
Familie	Klemens Zentgraf	2,412	1.6				
REP					1,256	0.8	0.0
GRAUEN					1,155	0.7	▲0.5
MLPD					654	0.4	
Informal votes		3,120			2,854		
Total valid votes		154,913			155,179		
Turnout		158,033	74.0	▲0.1			
SPD hold	Majority	2,293	1.5				
