= Ilm-Kreis II =

Electoral district in Thuringia, Germany

Ilm-Kreis II is an electoral constituency (German: Wahlkreis) represented in the Landtag of Thuringia. It elects one member via first-past-the-post voting. Under the current constituency numbering system, it is designated as constituency 23. It covers the northern and western part of Ilm-Kreis.

Ilm-Kreis II was created for the 1994 state election. Since 2019, it has been represented by Olaf Kießling of Alternative for Germany (AfD).

== Geography ==
As of the 2019 state election, Ilm-Kreis II covers the southern part of Ilm-Kreis, specifically the municipalities of Alkersleben, Amt Wachsenburg, Arnstadt, Bösleben-Wüllersleben, Dornheim, Elleben, Elxleben, Geratal (excluding Geraberg), Osthausen-Wülfershausen, Plaue (excluding Neusiß), Rockhausen, Stadtilm, and Witzleben. It also includes the village of Gehlberg from Suhl.

== Members ==
The constituency was held by the Christian Democratic Union (CDU) from its creation in 1994 until 2019, during which time it was represented by Winfried Neumann (1994–1999), Klaus von der Krone (1999–2014), and Jörg Thamm (2014–2019). It was won by Alternative for Germany in 2019, and is represented by Olaf Kießling.

| Election | Member | Party | % |
|---|---|---|---|
| 1994 | Winfried Neumann | CDU | 42.2 |
| 1999 | Klaus von der Krone | CDU | 51.7 |
| 2004 | Klaus von der Krone | CDU | 41.2 |
| 2009 | Klaus von der Krone | CDU | 29.8 |
| 2014 | Jörg Thamm | CDU | 34.0 |
| 2019 | Olaf Kießling | AfD | 29.6 |
| 2024 | Olaf Kießling | AfD | 35.4 |

== Election results ==
=== 2024 election ===
State election (2024): Ilm-Kreis II
| Notes: | Blue background denotes the winner of the electorate vote. Pink background denotes a candidate elected from their party list. Yellow background denotes an electorate win by a list member, or other incumbent. A ✓ or ✗ denotes status of any incumbent, win or lose respectively. | | | | | | |
| Party | Candidate | Votes | % | ±% | Party votes | % | ±% |
|---|---|---|---|---|---|---|---|
| AfD | ✓ Olaf Kießling | 13,569 | 40.2 | ▲10.6 | 12,063 | 35.4 | ▲7.5 |
| CDU | Jörg Becker | 9,421 | 27.9 | ▲4.7 | 7,060 | 20.7 | ▲1.6 |
| BSW | | | | | 5,442 | 16.0 | |
| Left | Kevin Kusbach | 4,630 | 13.7 | ▼9.0 | 4,594 | 13.5 | ▼16.4 |
| SPD | Florian Wagner | 2,433 | 7.2 | ▼4.9 | 1,836 | 5.4 | ▼2.6 |
| FW | Silvio Pahlke | 2,257 | 6.7 | ▲4.6 | 749 | 2.2 | |
| FDP | Christian Stonek | 759 | 2.2 | ▼3.2 | 430 | 1.3 | ▼4.1 |
| Greens | Kathrin Cagnin | 687 | 2.0 | ▼2.7 | 804 | 2.4 | ▼1.6 |
| APT | | | | | 361 | 1.1 | ▲0.1 |
| Familie | | | | | 210 | 0.6 | |
| BD | | | | | 195 | 0.6 | |
| Values | | | | | 145 | 0.4 | |
| Pirates | | | | | 99 | 0.3 | ▼0.1 |
| ÖDP | | | | | 44 | 0.1 | ▼0.3 |
| MLPD | | | | | 29 | 0.1 | ▼0.2 |
| Informal votes | | 626 | | | 321 | | |
| Total valid votes | | 33,756 | | | 34,061 | | |
| Turnout | | 34,382 | 74.7 | ▲8.0 | | | |
| AfD hold | Majority | 4,184 | 12.3 | ▲5.9 | | | |

=== 2019 election ===
State election (2019): Ilm-Kreis II
| Notes: | Blue background denotes the winner of the electorate vote. Pink background denotes a candidate elected from their party list. Yellow background denotes an electorate win by a list member, or other incumbent. A ✓ or ✗ denotes status of any incumbent, win or lose respectively. | | | | | | |
| Party | Candidate | Votes | % | ±% | Party votes | % | ±% |
|---|---|---|---|---|---|---|---|
| AfD | Olaf Kießling | 8,872 | 29.6 | | 8,397 | 27.9 | ▲12.7 |
| CDU | ✗ Jörg Thamm | 6,944 | 23.2 | ▼10.8 | 5,749 | 19.1 | ▼9.2 |
| Left | Donata Vogtschmidt | 6,796 | 22.7 | ▼9.2 | 9,004 | 30.0 | ▲1.1 |
| SPD | Eleonore Mühlbauer | 3,618 | 12.1 | ▼5.0 | 2,399 | 8.0 | ▼4.1 |
| FDP | Martin Mölders | 1,617 | 5.4 | ▲2.2 | 1,610 | 5.4 | ▲2.9 |
| Greens | Matthias Schlegel | 1,419 | 4.7 | ▼0.5 | 1,202 | 4.0 | ▼1.1 |
| Free Voters | Jens Schröder | 623 | 2.1 | | | | |
| MLPD | Manuela Eifler | 50 | 0.2 | | 100 | 0.3 | |
| List-only parties | | | | | 1,593 | 5.3 | |
| Informal votes | | 521 | | | 406 | | |
| Total valid votes | | 29,939 | | | 30,054 | | |
| Turnout | | 30,460 | 66.7 | ▲11.3 | | | |
| AfD gain from CDU | Majority | 1,928 | 6.4 | | | | |

=== 2014 election ===
State election (2014): Ilm-Kreis II
| Notes: | Blue background denotes the winner of the electorate vote. Pink background denotes a candidate elected from their party list. Yellow background denotes an electorate win by a list member, or other incumbent. A ✓ or ✗ denotes status of any incumbent, win or lose respectively. | | | | | | |
| Party | Candidate | Votes | % | ±% | Party votes | % | ±% |
|---|---|---|---|---|---|---|---|
| CDU | Jörg Thamm | 8,674 | 34.0 | ▲4.2 | 7,309 | 28.3 | 0.0 |
| Left | Jens Petermann | 8,138 | 31.9 | ▲7.1 | 7,414 | 28.9 | ▲2.6 |
| AfD | | | | | 3,910 | 15.2 | |
| SPD | Eleonore Mühlbauer | 4,360 | 17.1 | ▼1.0 | 3,126 | 12.1 | ▼7.0 |
| NPD | Jonny Albrecht | 1,641 | 6.4 | ▲1.8 | 1,129 | 4.4 | ▼0.5 |
| Greens | Matthias Schlegel | 1,337 | 5.2 | ▲0.2 | 1,319 | 5.1 | ▼1.4 |
| FDP | Martin Mölders | 807 | 3.2 | ▼2.5 | 646 | 2.5 | ▼4.9 |
| Pirates | Thomas Hupel | 589 | 2.3 | | 258 | 1.0 | |
| List-only parties | | | | | 673 | 2.6 | |
| Informal votes | | 652 | | | 414 | | |
| Total valid votes | | 25,546 | | | 25,784 | | |
| Turnout | | 26,198 | 55.4 | ▼2.2 | | | |
| CDU hold | Majority | 536 | 2.1 | ▼2.9 | | | |

=== 2009 election ===
State election (2009): Ilm-Kreis II
| Notes: | Blue background denotes the winner of the electorate vote. Pink background denotes a candidate elected from their party list. Yellow background denotes an electorate win by a list member, or other incumbent. A ✓ or ✗ denotes status of any incumbent, win or lose respectively. | | | | | | |
| Party | Candidate | Votes | % | ±% | Party votes | % | ±% |
|---|---|---|---|---|---|---|---|
| CDU | ✓ Klaus von der Krone | 8,304 | 29.8 | ▼11.4 | 7,907 | 28.3 | ▼15.0 |
| Left | Sabine Berninger | 6,914 | 24.8 | ▼3.6 | 7,327 | 26.3 | 0.0 |
| SPD | Eleonore Mühlbauer | 5,057 | 18.1 | ▲2.2 | 5,317 | 19.1 | ▲4.6 |
| Free Voters | Georg Norbert Bräutigam | 3,363 | 12.1 | | 1,870 | 6.7 | ▲5.1 |
| FDP | Frank-André Thies | 1,590 | 5.7 | ▼4.7 | 2,069 | 7.4 | ▲2.9 |
| Greens | Matthias Schlegel | 1,393 | 5.0 | ▲0.9 | 1,823 | 6.5 | ▲2.4 |
| NPD | Jürgen Voigt | 1,279 | 4.6 | | 1,363 | 4.9 | ▲3.5 |
| List-only parties | | | | | 233 | 0.8 | |
| Informal votes | | 678 | | | 669 | | |
| Total valid votes | | 27,900 | | | 27,909 | | |
| Turnout | | 28,578 | 57.6 | ▲2.9 | | | |
| CDU hold | Majority | 1,390 | 5.0 | ▼7.8 | | | |

=== 2004 election ===
State election (2004): Ilm-Kreis II
| Notes: | Blue background denotes the winner of the electorate vote. Pink background denotes a candidate elected from their party list. Yellow background denotes an electorate win by a list member, or other incumbent. A ✓ or ✗ denotes status of any incumbent, win or lose respectively. | | | | | | |
| Party | Candidate | Votes | % | ±% | Party votes | % | ±% |
|---|---|---|---|---|---|---|---|
| CDU | ✓ Klaus von der Krone | 10,804 | 41.2 | ▼10.5 | 11,427 | 43.3 | ▼11.0 |
| PDS | Frank Kuschel | 7,456 | 28.4 | ▲10.9 | 6,945 | 26.3 | ▲7.9 |
| SPD | Erwin Erdmann | 4,165 | 15.9 | ▼7.9 | 3,834 | 14.5 | ▼4.2 |
| FDP | Dirk Sterzik | 2,723 | 10.4 | ▲8.5 | 1,180 | 4.5 | ▲3.6 |
| Greens | Stefan Schubert | 1,067 | 4.1 | ▲1.2 | 1,095 | 4.1 | ▲2.3 |
| List-only parties | | | | | 1,918 | 7.3 | |
| Informal votes | | 1,508 | | | 1,324 | | |
| Total valid votes | | 26,215 | | | 26,399 | | |
| Turnout | | 27,723 | 54.7 | ▼8.3 | | | |
| CDU hold | Majority | 3,348 | 12.8 | ▼15.1 | | | |

=== 1999 election ===
State election (1999): Ilm-Kreis II
| Notes: | Blue background denotes the winner of the electorate vote. Pink background denotes a candidate elected from their party list. Yellow background denotes an electorate win by a list member, or other incumbent. A ✓ or ✗ denotes status of any incumbent, win or lose respectively. | | | | | | |
| Party | Candidate | Votes | % | ±% | Party votes | % | ±% |
|---|---|---|---|---|---|---|---|
| CDU | Klaus von der Krone | 16,189 | 51.7 | ▲9.5 | 17,060 | 54.3 | ▲12.1 |
| SPD | Petra Heß | 7,457 | 23.8 | ▼11.2 | 5,864 | 18.7 | ▼12.7 |
| PDS | Steffen Dittes | 5,468 | 17.5 | ▲3.4 | 5,788 | 18.4 | ▲3.1 |
| Greens | Jürgen Ludwig | 917 | 2.9 | ▼3.2 | 555 | 1.8 | ▼2.4 |
| REP | Gerhard Otto | 715 | 2.3 | | 183 | 0.6 | ▼0.6 |
| FDP | Roland Buttgereit | 585 | 1.9 | ▼0.8 | 283 | 0.9 | ▼1.8 |
| List-only parties | | | | | 1,661 | 5.3 | |
| Informal votes | | 512 | | | 449 | | |
| Total valid votes | | 31,331 | | | 31,394 | | |
| Turnout | | 31,843 | 63.0 | ▼12.6 | | | |
| CDU hold | Majority | 8,732 | 27.9 | ▲20.7 | | | |

=== 1994 election ===
State election (1994): Ilmkreis II
| Notes: | Blue background denotes the winner of the electorate vote. Pink background denotes a candidate elected from their party list. Yellow background denotes an electorate win by a list member, or other incumbent. A ✓ or ✗ denotes status of any incumbent, win or lose respectively. | | | | | | |
| Party | Candidate | Votes | % | ±% | Party votes | % | ±% |
|---|---|---|---|---|---|---|---|
| CDU | Winfried Neumann | 15,093 | 42.2 | | 15,079 | 42.2 | |
| SPD | | 12,505 | 34.9 | | 11,232 | 31.4 | |
| PDS | | 5,030 | 14.1 | | 5,472 | 15.3 | |
| Greens | | 2,180 | 6.1 | | 1,504 | 4.2 | |
| FDP | | 972 | 2.7 | | 963 | 2.7 | |
| List-only parties | | | | | 1,484 | 4.2 | |
| Informal votes | | 1,180 | | | 1,226 | | |
| Total valid votes | | 35,780 | | | 35,734 | | |
| Turnout | | 36,960 | 75.6 | | | | |
| CDU win new seat | Majority | 2,588 | 7.3 | | | | |
