= Max Otte =

German-American economist and author (born 1964)

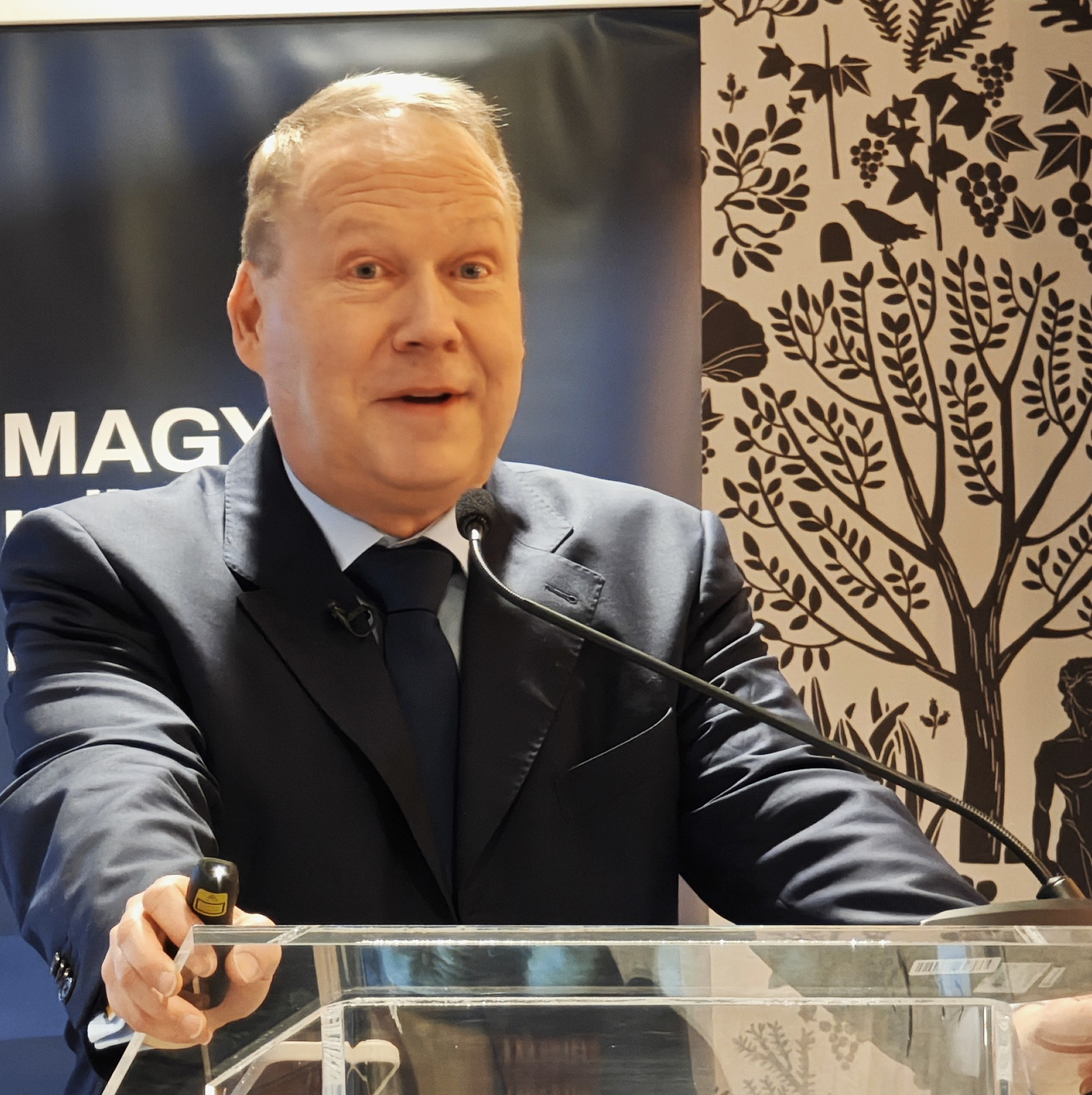
- Otte in 2026
- Born: Matthias Otte; 7 October 1964 (age 62); Plettenberg, West Germany
- Citizenship: Germany; United States
- Education: University of Cologne; American University; Princeton University (MA)
- Occupations: Economist, author, fund manager, political activist
- Known for: Prediction of the 2008 financial crisis; New Hambach Festival
- Political party: Christian Democratic Union (expelled in 2022)
- Movement: Values Union
- Children: 3
- Awards: Mont Pelerin Society (1988); Woodrow Wilson Fellowship (1989–91)
- Website: max-otte.de

Matthias "Max" Otte (born 7 October 1964) is an economist, publicist and right-wing political activist who holds German and U.S. citizenship. Otte, who has held professorships in Worms, Graz and Erfurt, is currently a fund manager. He has written several books, mainly on financial policy topics.

From June 2018 to January 2021, Otte was chairman of the board of trustees of the AfD-affiliated Desiderius-Erasmus-Foundation. A member of the CDU since 1991, he led the Werteunion from May 2021 until January 2022. In January 2022, Otte became provisionally expelled from the CDU when he was nominated by the right-wing populist party AfD as a candidate for the 2022 German presidential election. He faced further proceedings for a permanent exclusion from the CDU which concluded in August 2022 with Otte's formal expulsion from the CDU.

== Early life ==
Otte was born in Plettenberg, West Germany to Lore Otte, née Hauter, and Max Otte (1928–1983), a vocational school teacher and local politician. After the death of his father, Otte took his first name Max. Max Otte obtained his Abitur (university entrance qualification) at Albert-Schweitzer-Gymnasium Plettenberg in 1983.

=== Education ===
In 1983, Otte graduated from high school in Plettenberg. From 1983 to 1989, he studied business administration, economics and political science at the University of Cologne. Between 1986 and 1987, he spent a year abroad at the American University in Washington, D.C., on a scholarship from the Konrad Adenauer Foundation, where he majored in economic policy, finance and marketing. During this time, he received various scholarships and awards. He completed his education in 1989 with a degree in economics. After graduating from Princeton University with a Master of Arts in Public Affairs in 1991, Otte earned his doctorate there in 1997 with Aaron Friedberg's thesis "A Rising Middle Power? - German Foreign Policy in Transformation."

=== Career ===
Otte worked as a consultant for international organizations and the public sector at Kienbaum and Partners from 1989 to 1994 and was an employee of the Gütersloh Center for Higher Education (CHE) in 1995. From 1997 to 1998, he was employed by Arthur D. Little. He advised various companies and organizations, including Munich Re, the German Federal Ministry of Economics, and the United Nations. From 1998 to 2000, Otte was assistant professor of International Economics and International Management at the Department of International Relations at Boston University. He also helped establish the Executive MBA Program in Business Integration at the Julius Maximilians University of Würzburg from 2001 to 2005.

In 2001, he became a tenured professor of general and international business administration at Worms University of Applied Sciences, where he taught marketing, international business studies, and finance and investment in the departments of international business administration and foreign trade, as well as tourism. From 2011 to 2016, he was a professor of quantitative and qualitative business analysis and diagnosis at Karl Franzens University in Graz, Austria. In 2018, he retired from civil service at his own request.

Otte has been a fund manager since 2005. For a time, he held a lectureship at the Faculty of Political Science at the University of Erfurt.

Otte is the author and editor of several books. Otte has published articles in newspapers such as the Frankfurter Allgemeine Zeitung, Die Welt, Der Spiegel, Financial Times Deutschland, The Times, Harvard Business Review and Wirtschaftsdienst and has appeared on television, with broadcasters such as ARD, ZDF, SWR, n-TV, Bloomberg and N24. In 2021, he published his most personal book, In Search of Lost Germany, writing about his childhood, his parents, grandparents, and the people who influenced him.

=== Author ===
Otte is the author of several books mainly on financial policy topics. His first books appeared starting in 1989, initially publishing exclusively for the university field, such as on macroeconomics or general economic policy. His first book outside of this field was America for Businessmen: das Einmaleins der ungeschriebenen Regeln, published by Campus-Verlag in 1996. In 2006, Otte published the book "Der Crash kommt. The New Global Economic Crisis and How to Prepare for It." In it, he predicted a collapse of the stock markets. During the 2008 financial crisis, Otte made this known to a broad public. This was followed by "The Information Crash" and "Stop the Euro Disaster," in which he took a critical look at the euro crisis and called for Greece to be allowed to go broke. In his last book "Auf der Suche nach dem verlorenen Deutschland", he writes about his childhood, his family, and about flight and expulsion in his father's family.

=== Private life ===
Otte is the father of three children. Otte has held U.S. citizenship in addition to German citizenship since 2005.

== Investment funds ==
In 2003, he founded the Institut für Vermögensentwicklung (IFVE) as a limited liability company. A stock corporation established in Switzerland in the meantime has since been deleted.

Otte first became active as a fund advisor in October 2005 for a fund launched by Banque SCS Alliance in Luxembourg, the Pléiade Actions "Privatinvestor." He recommended this in 2006 in the book Der Crash kommt as a "fund for the crisis," but discontinued his advisory work for this fund in October 2008 during the 2008 financial crisis. In March 2008, the investment fund PI Global Value Fund was launched in Liechtenstein, which according to Otte's statements invested according to his strategy. This second fund received marketing authorization for Germany, Austria, and Switzerland in 2011. This was followed in July 2013 by the Max Otte Vermögensbildungsfonds AMI, launched by Ampega Investment, a fund exclusively for German investors, as Otte said he could no longer advise PI Global Value personally, but only through his Swiss "Privatinvestor" management company, due to his residence in Cologne and the tightened legal situation since the 2008 financial crisis. At the end of 2016, Otte initiated a hedge fund for professional investors. The fund was launched in March 2008.

In November 2009, he was voted "Money Manager of the Year" by the readers of the stock market journal Börse Online, winning 10,000 votes from a total of 24,000. In the same month, he confirmed that the value of (European) stocks were not yet too expensive. He defended his title as "Money Manager of the Year" in 2010 and obtained more than half of the votes, competing against 10 other money managers.

The PI Global Value fund (WKN: A0NE9G), launched in March 2008, "is among the top ten to 15 percent." However, the sale of gold mining stocks in 2015 was "simply wrong." According to a report by Börse Online, the "accusation of continuous underperformance" of the funds initiated by Otte is also unjustified. The PI Global Value fund had beaten the DAX, EURO STOXX 50 as well as the MSCI World over its entire term until the end of 2016. During this period, the fund had recorded an increase in value of 87.43 percent, which corresponded to an annual return of 7.46 percent.

In November 2017, it was revealed that Otte had moved the management of his funds from Switzerland to Germany. To do so, he had received a license from the German Federal Financial Supervisory Authority (BaFin). In 2020, this was extended to a portfolio management license.

In July 2021, the fund was changed from Max Otte Vermögensbildungsfonds to PI Vermögensbildungsfonds (DE000A1J3AM3). The fund is managed by Bayerische Vermögen AG in Traunstein.

== Positions ==
=== Finance ===
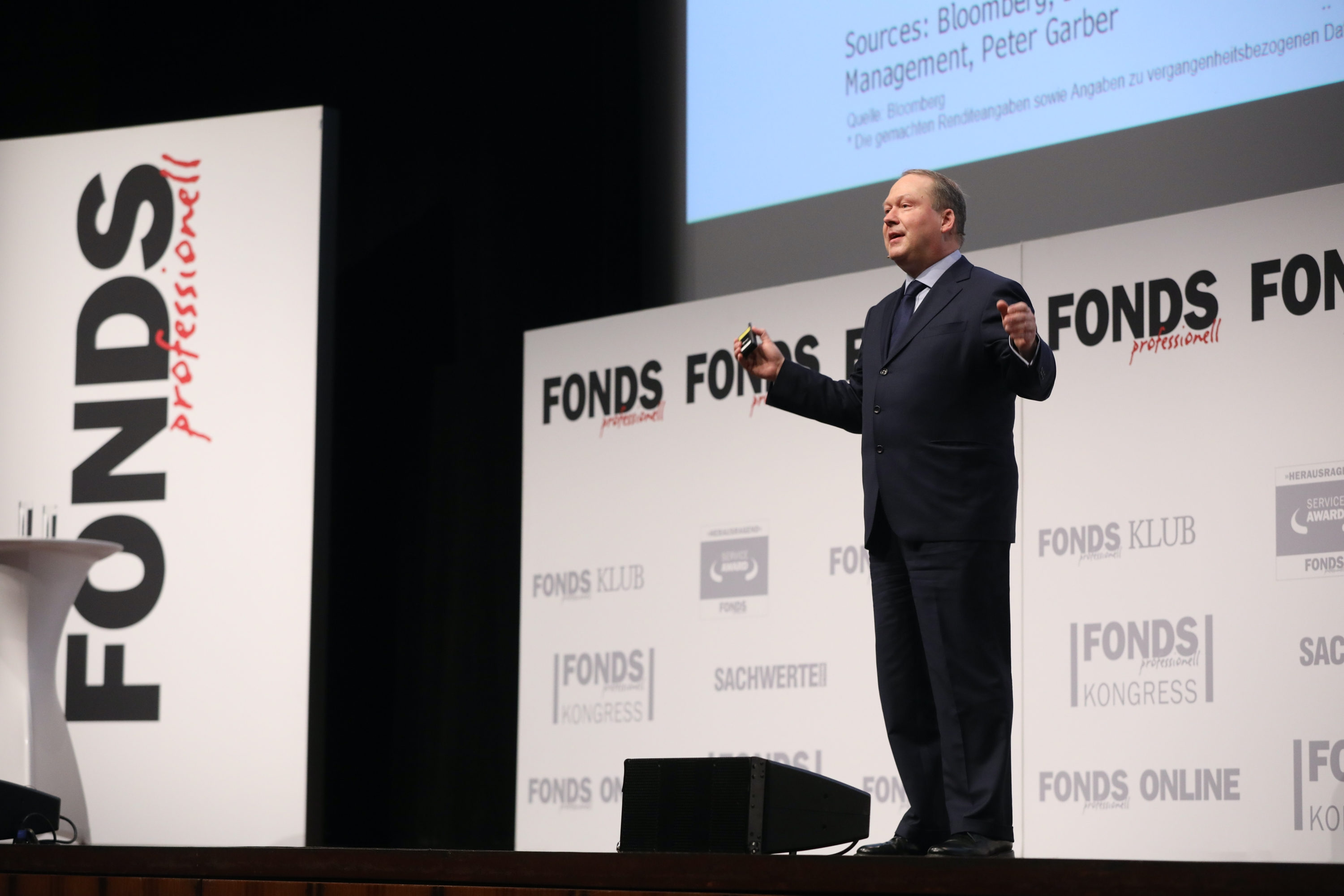
Max Otte at a fund congress (2019)

In 2006, Otte published the book "The Crash is Coming. The New Global Economic Crisis and How to Prepare for It." In it, he predicted a collapse of the stock markets. During the 2008 financial crisis, Otte made this publicly known.

In 2009, Otte advocated the nationalization of the bank Hypo Real Estate. He sees Germany's savings banks and cooperative banks as a stability factor and a way to promote small and medium-sized businesses.

In a hearing in the Finance Committee of the German Bundestag in 2010, Otte expressed the view that a financial transaction tax would lead to lower fees for money investors via reduced portfolio reallocations. Otte described the international financial market as a threat to democracy. He said that the financial sector had hijacked politics. In the monetary policy of central banks, Otte sees planned economy and drew comparisons to the final phase of the GDR.

Marcel Fratzscher, president of the German Institute for Economic Research, regards Otte as a "crash prophet". According to Fratzscher Otte partly describes economic problems correctly, but draws false conclusions from that. Fratzscher criticizes that Otte deliberately incites panic in order to sell his books. Michael Blume notes that Otte's forecasts regarding the value of gold were wrong and the income value of the funds managed by Otte were "weak to embarrassing".

During a protest rally over COVID-19 policies in Germany on 31 May 2020, Otte talked about an alleged connection between the COVID-19 pandemic and the abolition of cash payments. He considered these two as "two sides of the same coin" and suggested that a financially strong lobby might be behind all of that. Blume concludes that Otte mixes up nationalistic, racist and antisemitic allusions to convey his conspiracy beliefs.

=== European Union ===
In April 2010, Otte called for the most indebted countries in Europe to leave the Eurozone. In 2010, he supported a call for the German government to ban uncovered short selling. Otte advocates massive regulation of financial markets and calls for rules on banks' capital adequacy as the basis of their liability in a market economy. He criticized a legitimacy deficit in the European Union.

=== Criticism of capitalism ===
At an event of the globalization-critical non-governmental organization Attac in August 2017, Otte criticized that politics had capitulated to the capital lobby. He described the prevailing economic order as "loot capitalism" for the benefit of the super-rich and called for financial income to be taxed like labor income. He described the prevailing opinion of many economists as a "religion of hypercapitalism" that is oriented only toward self-interest.

=== Joint Statement 2018 ===
In March 2018, Otte was among the first signatories of the "Joint Declaration 2018", an appeal by German authors, publicists, artists, scientists, and politicians against "damaging Germany" by an "illegal mass immigration" taking place in the context of the refugee crisis in Germany from 2015.

=== Oswald Spengler Society ===
In 2017, Otte founded the Oswald Spengler Society with David Engels and Michael Thöndl, on whose presidium Otte serves as treasurer. In 2018, the Oswald Spengler Prize, endowed by Otte and worth 10,000 euros, was awarded for the first time to Michel Houellebecq. In 2020, it was awarded to Walter Scheidel, a historian who teaches at Stanford University.

=== Murder of Walter Lübcke ===
After the right-wing murder of Walter Lübcke in 2019 Otte questioned the right-wing extremist motive of the murderer. He criticized the media for an alleged agitation against the political right. This led to a number of politicians from the Union and the Value Union to call for Otte leaving the Christian Democratic Union of Germany (CDU). Otte didn't leave the CDU and became federal president of the Value Union in May 2021.

=== Coalition government ===
Before the 2017 German federal election Otte said he would vote for the Alternative for Germany (AfD) and argued in favor of a coalition government between the CDU and the AfD. In January 2022 Otte became nominee of the AfD for the 2022 German presidential election. As a consequence he was expelled from the CDU temporarily and moreover faced expulsion proceedings for a permanent exclusion. The proceedings concluded on 3 August 2022 with the expected result of Otte's formal expulsion from the CDU.

Before being nominated as the AfD candidate for the presidency, Max Otte donated at least 30,000 euros to the district association of party leader Tino Chrupalla. AfD party representatives deny a connection to his candidacy. As the CDU has fallen, the AFD has risen to become the second largest party in the German Bundestag.

== New Hambach Festival ==
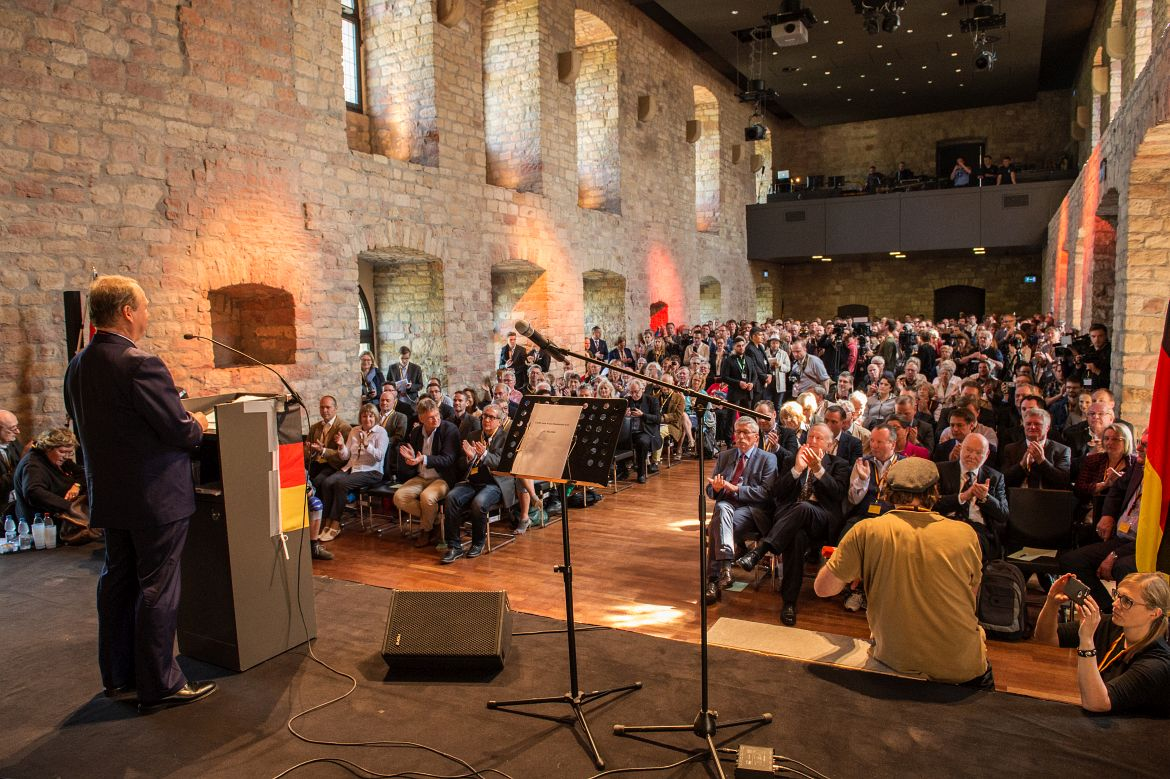
Max Otte at the New Hambach Festival (2018)

On 5 May 2018, Otte was the organizer of the New Hambach Festival. The event was attended by around 1,200 visitors and various speakers from the right-wing populist camp, including Jörg Meuthen, Thilo Sarrazin and Vera Lengsfeld, who wanted to continue the tradition of the Hambach Festival of 1832.

Even before the event, Melanie Amann pointed out in Der Spiegel a method "in the right-wing milieu" of claiming historical dates and places for oneself and drawing one's own "actions as a logical continuation of the work of heroic role models." Otte denied to the magazine that this was an AfD event. However, he said, the "AfD is also the only party that openly addresses the basic problem of this country. Namely, we are witnessing the dismantling of everything we can be proud of."

The event was held again in 2019 and 2020.

== Memberships ==
Otte was a member of the CDU from 1991 until his temporary expulsion in January 2022. The expulsion was made permanent in August 2022. He became a member of the Values Union in 2017 and served as its chairman from May 2021 until January 2022.

In 2006, Otte was a founding member of the Center for Value Investing as well as its director and supervisory board. According to his website he is also a member of the Atlantik-Brücke, the German-American Business Club Frankfurt and the German Association for Financial Analysis and Asset Management. Otte has been serving on the advisory board of the Prussian Society Berlin-Brandenburg since 2010. He is a member of the German Language Association.

== Awards ==
Otte received the Mont Pelerin Society Award for his 1988 essay "Toward an Open World Order". This society was founded in 1947 by Friedrich August von Hayek as an association of academics, businessmen and journalists.

Otte is the initiator of the Human Roots Award, which is presented by the Römisch-Germanisches Zentralmuseum in Mainz. He was the founding benefactor of the first 2017 prize of €10,000. It is an international archaeology prize that was awarded for the first time in 2017.

== Books ==
=== A Rising Middle Power? ===
In his book A Rising Middle Power? (New York, 2000), Max Otte examines German foreign policy in recent years. He focuses in particular on whether the increase in power following the reunification has led to a shift in the style of the Federal Republic of Germany's foreign policy. Alongside a political economic analysis of the power potential of the Federal Republic of Germany, the book contains three case studies: Germany and European unification/introduction of the Euro, Germany and military interventions abroad and the eastward enlargement of the EU. Ottes surprising conclusion is that, whilst Germany's power has grown, the demands on the reunified country have grown even more strongly. Germany diplomacy continues to be typical of a middle power, aiming at reconciliation.

Thomas Berger described it as a "welcome contribution to the growing literature on German foreign policy", but criticised inconsistencies in Otte's realist framework and the author not operationalising "middle power". John Duffield shared Berger's disapproval of Otte's framework, calling it "insufficiently developed" and asserting that Otte's argument comes close to "becoming nonfalsifiable". He also objected to Otte not engaging with alternative explanations and criticised a number of internal contradictions.

=== Investieren statt Sparen ===
In his book Investieren statt Sparen Otte describes how private investors can achieve long-term wealth creation. It is in the interest of the investor to carry out his financial planning personally, and not have it performed by a third party. Investment is the most important component of long-term wealth creation, although personal responsibility, transparency and availability of reliable financial information as well as patience for the investment horizon are also essential. Sound investments also involve taking calculable risks. In addition, Otte describes the advantage internet offers for carrying out online bank transactions, automatically placing orders, as well as facilitating communication and exchange of information between investors. The effect of doubling private assets is based on the principle of compound interest and the possibility of earning an approx. average annual return of 8-10%, for example on the DAX. The financial objectives are determined by disposable net income, the return on investment, the investment period and the age of the investor. The investment amount is defined as savings minus consumption. The highest yields can be obtained from investment in stocks. The ownership of stocks makes the investor co-owner of a company, enabling him to benefit from the economic success of the company's goods and services. Successful long-term investments by private investors have largely resulted from investment in strong brands and quality organizations such as Coca-Cola, McDonald's, Sony, Nestlé, Procter & Gamble, IBM, etc., which have been established on the market for a long period of time.

The value of stocks is based on the present and future earnings of the organization. Otte divides stocks into several categories: "Meisteraktien" ("master stocks": internationally renowned companies with global brands such as DaimlerChrysler, Coca-Cola, Siemens), "Kaufleuteaktien" ("trader stocks": large corporations that are currently undervalued with a low price / earnings ratio; high earnings in spite of low market value), "Königsaktien" ("king stocks": the world's best mature large corporations and industry leaders that grow less quickly than revolutionary stocks), "Revolutionärsaktien" ("revolutionary stocks": young growing companies with revolutionary, innovative ideas such as Google, Microsoft, Cisco Systems, etc.) and "Valueaktien" (blue chips).

=== Der Crash kommt. ===
After the publication of his book Der Crash kommt., Max Otte became more widely known. The book begins with the preface from the first edition in 2006:

I can't tell you whether the crash will come in 2008. Perhaps it will come already in 2007, or even later in 2009 or 2010. Human behavior – for that is what the outbreak of a major global economic crisis is about - cannot be predicted with mathematic precision, even if some "crisis prophets" will always try to do so. Some of the strongest indications seem to point to the year 2010, others to the end of 2007. However, if I have correctly understood the signals coming from the world economy, then it will have to crash – and with an enormous impact.

— Max Otte

Otte sees himself as a political economist in the tradition of Friedrich List, Karl Marx, Max Weber, Werner Sombart, Alexander Rüstow and Wilhelm Röpke, and is inspired by the Austrian school of economic thought.

Otte accurately forecast that the U.S. property market and subprime securities would spark the crisis. He believes that there are several causes of the crisis:

- the rise in debt since the beginning of the neo-liberal revolution at the beginning of the 80s, in particular in the USA
- the excessive growth in financial assets, deregulation and relaxed monetary policy
- the shift in the center of the world economy
- excessive globalization
- the deterioration in economic practices, partly caused by financial derivatives
- demographic challenges

Moreover, Otte emphasizes that financial crises are not unusual in capitalism, however the majority of economists are reluctant to analyse them. In the last two chapters of the book Otte gives investment tips.

== Publications (selection) ==
=== Monographs ===
- Otte, Max (1996). Amerika für Geschäftsleute. Das Einmaleins der ungeschriebenen Regeln [America for business people. The basics of the unwritten rules.] (in German). Frankfurt am Main: Campus-Verlag. ISBN 3-593-35592-2.
- Otte, Max (1988). The United States, Japan, West Germany and Europe in the international economy 1977–1987. Between conflict and coordination. Idstein: Schulz-Kirchner. ISBN 3-925196-67-6.
- Otte, Max (2006). Der Crash kommt. Die neue Weltwirtschaftskrise und wie Sie sich darauf vorbereiten [The crash is coming. The new global economic crisis and how to prepare for it.] (in German). Berlin: Econ Verlag. ISBN 3-430-20001-6.
- Otte, Max (2009). Der Informationscrash. Wie wir systematisch für dumm verkauft werden [The Information Crash. How we are systematically taken for fools.] (in German). Berlin: Econ Verlag. ISBN 978-3-430-20078-3.
- Otte, Max (2011). Stoppt das Euro-Desaster [Stop the Euro Disaster] (in German). Berlin: Ullstein Verlag. ISBN 978-3-550-08896-4.
- Otte, Max (2012). Endlich mit Aktien Geld verdienen. Die Strategien und Techniken, die Erfolg versprechen [Earn money with shares at last. The strategies and techniques that promise success.] (in German). München: FinanzBuch Verlag. ISBN 978-3-89879-631-6.
- Otte, Max (2016). Rettet unser Bargeld! [Save our cash!] (in German). Berlin: Ullstein Verlag. ISBN 978-3-550-08158-3.
- Otte, Max (2016). Investieren statt sparen. Anlegen in Zeiten von Niedrigzinsen, Bargeldverbot und Brexit [Investing instead of saving. Investing in times of low interest rates, cash bans and Brexit.] (in German). Berlin: Econ Verlag. ISBN 978-3-430-20225-1.
- Otte, Max (2019). Die Finanzmärkte und die ökonomische Selbstbehauptung Europas. Gedanken zu Finanzkrisen, Marktwirtschaft und Unternehmertum [The financial markets and the economic self-assertion of Europe. Thoughts on financial crises, market economy and entrepreneurship.] (in German). Wiesbaden: Springer Gabler. ISBN 978-3-658-23178-1.
- Otte, Max (2020). Weltsystemcrash. Krisen, Unruhen und die Geburt einer neuen Weltordnung [World System Crash. Crises, unrest and the birth of a new world order.] (in German). München: FinanzBuch Verlag. ISBN 978-3-95972-282-7.
- Otte, Max (2021). Auf der Suche nach dem verlorenen Deutschland: Notizen aus einer anderen Zeit [In Search of the Lost Germany: Notes from Another Time.] (in German). München: FinanzBuch Verlag. p. 288. ISBN 978-3959724036.

=== Editions (publisher, co-editor or co-worker) ===
- Mackay, Charles; Vega, Joseph de la (2010). Otte, Max (ed.). Gier und Wahnsinn. Warum der Crash immer wieder kommt ... [Greed and madness. Why the crash always comes back ...] (in German). München: FinanzBuch Verlag. ISBN 978-3-89879-560-9.
- Fergusson, Adam (2011). Otte, Max (ed.). . Hyperinflation und ihre Folgen am Beispiel der Weimarer Republik [The end of money - hyperinflation and its consequences using the example of the Weimar Republic] (in German). FinanzBuch Verlag. ISBN 978-3-89879-627-9.
- Brandeis, Louis D. (2012). Otte, Max (ed.). Das Geld der Anderen. Wie die Banker uns ausnehmen [Other people's money. How the bankers are fleecing us.] (in German). München: FinanzBuch Verlag. ISBN 978-3-89879-679-8.
- Otte, Max; Steinbach, Erika, eds. (2018). Nachdenken für Deutschland. Wie wir die Zukunft unseres Landes sichern können [Thinking for Germany. How we can secure the future of our country.]. Schriftenreihe der Desiderius Erasmus Stiftung (in German). Lüdinghausen/Berlin: Manuscriptum Verlagsbuchhandlung. ISBN 978-3-944872-89-6.
- Otte, Max; Engels, David; Thöndl, Michael, eds. (2018). Der lange Schatten Oswald Spenglers: Hundert Jahre Untergang des Abendlandes [The Long Shadow of Oswald Spengler: One Hundred Years of the Decline of the Occident] (in German). Lüdinghausen/Berlin: Manuscriptum Verlagsbuchhaltung. ISBN 978-3-944872-71-1.
- Otte, Max; Houellebecq, Michel; Engels, David; Morgenthaler, Gerd, eds. (2019). Michel Houellebecq, Oswald Spengler und der "Untergang des Abendlandes: Reden anlässlich der Verleihung des Oswald-Spengel-Preises an Michael Houellebecq in Brüssel am 19. Oktober 2018 [Michel Houellebecq, Oswald Spengler and the "Fall of the Occident: Speeches on the occasion of the award of the Oswald Spengler Prize to Michael Houellebecq in Brussels on 19 October 2018] (in German). Lüdinghausen/Berlin: Edition Sonderwege, Manuscriptum Verlagsbuchhaltung. ISBN 978-3-944872-91-9.

=== Essays ===
- Otte, Max (11 January 1999). Die Unternehmenskultur entscheidet über den Erfolg von Fusionen [Corporate culture determines the success of mergers.]. Frankfurter Allgemeine Zeitung (in German).
- Otte, Max (2000). The New Atlantic Century. Harvard Business Review. pp. 2–3.
- Otte, Max (2011). Ziegler, Dieter (ed.). Die Finanzkrise, die Ökonomen, der "Crashprophet" und die Wissenschaft von der Ökonomie [The financial crisis, economists, the "crash prophet" and the science of economics.]. Jahrbuch für Wirtschaftsgeschichte (in German). Berlin: Verlag Walter de Gruyter. pp. 191–217.

=== Other ===
- Otte, Max (2003). Otte, Max (ed.). Der Privatinvestor [The private investor]. weekly market letter (in German). Köln: Institut für Vermögensentwicklung (IFVE).
- Otte, Max (27 May 2020). Neustart für die Wirtschaft in Deutschland und Europa [A New Start for the Economy in Germany and Europe] (PDF) (Speech). Public Hearing in the German Bundestag (in German). Berlin: Deutscher Bundestag.
