= Olaf Kießling =

German politician (born 1967)

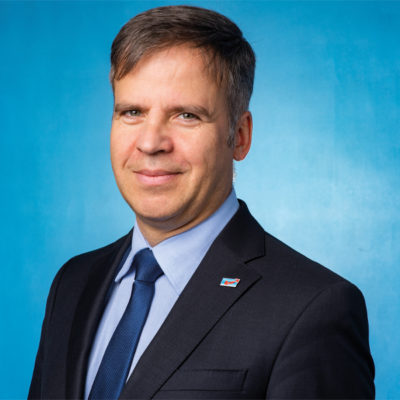
- Kießling in 2020

Member of the Landtag of Thuringia
- Incumbent
- Assumed office 14 October 2014
- Constituency: Ilm-Kreis II (2019–present)

Personal details
- Born: 22 May 1967 (age 58) Elgersburg
- Party: Alternative for Germany

Olaf Kießling (born 22 May 1967 in Elgersburg) is a German politician serving as a member of the Landtag of Thuringia since 2014. He previously served as treasurer of the AfD Thuringia.
