= Murder of Walter Lübcke =

2019 assassination in Hesse, Germany

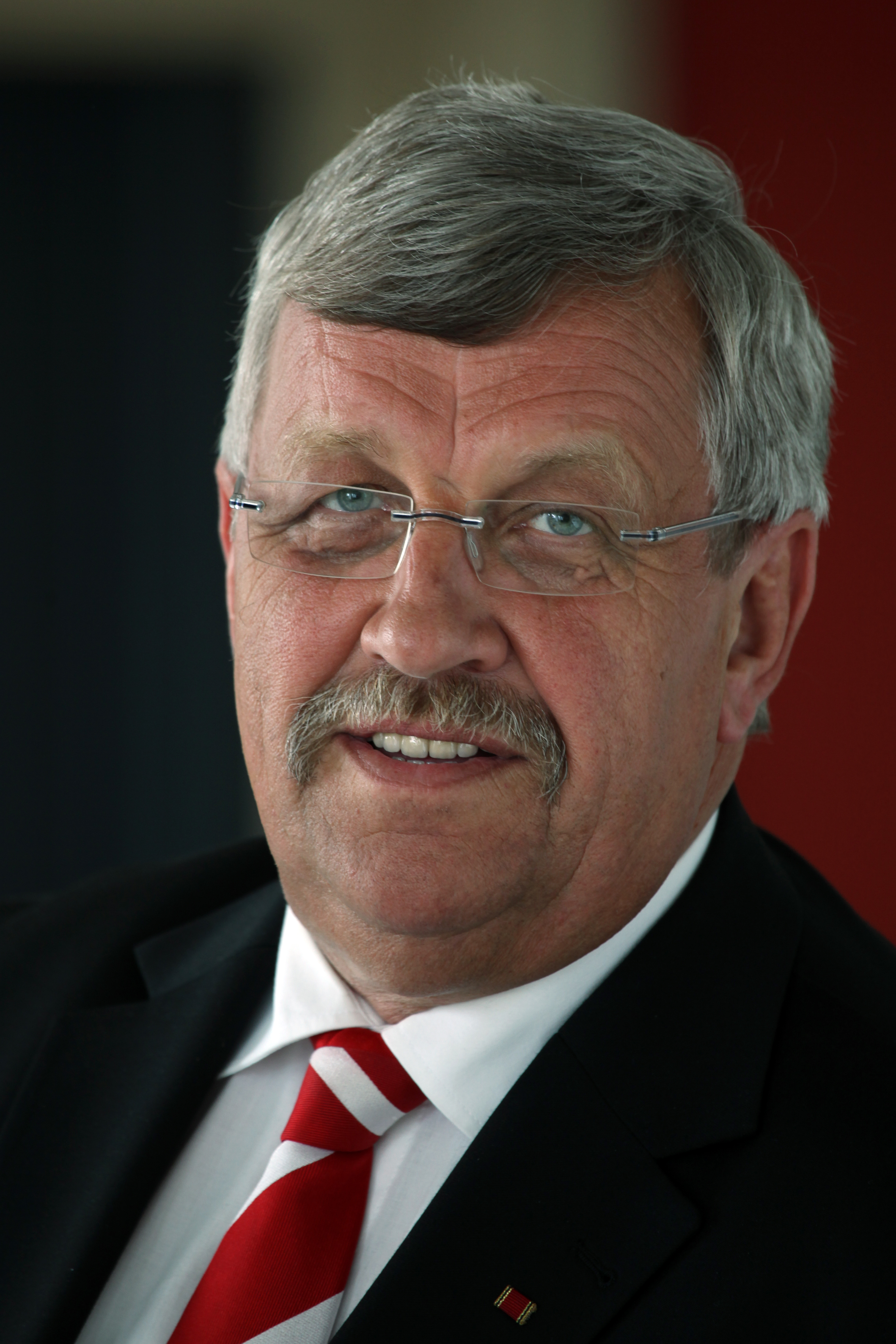
- Lübcke in 2009
- Location: Istha, Wolfhagen-Istha, Germany
- Date: 1 June 2019 – 2 June 2019; Between 23:20 and 23:30 (CEST)
- Target: Walter Lübcke
- Attack type: Assassination by shooting, domestic terrorism
- Weapon: .38 Special Rossi revolver
- Deaths: 1 (Lübcke)
- Perpetrator: Stephan Ernst
- Motive: Far-right extremism

On the night of 1–2 June 2019, German politician Walter Lübcke, the Regierungspräsident (regional governor) of the Kassel region, was assassinated at his home in Wolfhagen-Istha, Hesse, Germany. Lübcke was found dead from a gunshot to the head by his son a few hours after his murder.

Right-wing extremist Stephan Ernst was arrested as the prime suspect two weeks later and further implicated by DNA evidence. He issued a confession, which Ernst recanted shortly after, instead claiming that one of his accomplices had been the gunman, although this was retracted by the time of trial two years later. Investigations against two other right-wing extremists, accused of co-planning the murder with Ernst and being present at the shooting, were suspended in 2019 and 2020. On 28 January 2021, Ernst was sentenced to life imprisonment.

Lübcke had spoken out for the admittance of refugees and had opposed agitation against them by the local offshoot of the far-right political movement Pegida at a public meeting in October 2015. He subsequently received numerous death threats for many years.

Lübcke's murder and its background and consequences started a broad public debate in Germany, due to which right-wing terrorism, executed by Combat 18 and related fascist organizations and individuals, received more scrutiny. The debate concerns the German security authorities' knowledge of the suspects, the possible co-responsibility of the right-wing populist party Alternative for Germany (AfD) for the murder, the relationship of the major political party Christian Democratic Union of Germany (CDU) with the AfD, increasingly frequent attacks on local politicians, and the lack of prosecution of hate crimes in social networking services and social media.

== Details ==
On 2 June 2019, Lübcke was found dead on the terrace of his residence in the village of Istha, which is part of the town of Wolfhagen. He had been shot in the head at close range with an illegally owned Rossi .38 revolver. On 15 June 2019, 45-year-old suspect Stephan Ernst was arrested.

== Perpetrator ==
Ernst was born in 1973 in Wiesbaden and grew up in Holzhausen, a part of the town of Hohenstein (Untertaunus) since 1984. He is married and the father of two children and lived in the eastern part of Kassel.

At the time of Lübcke's murder, Ernst was already known to have held extreme right-wing political views and to have had connections to the German branch of the neo-Nazi terrorist group Combat 18 (C18). He also had connections to the far-right National Democratic Party of Germany (NPD) and the Alternative für Deutschland (AfD) parties.

Ernst had been previously convicted for knife and bomb attacks against targets connected to ethnic minorities in Germany.

Ernst issued a confession on 25 July 2019, which was recanted on 2 July 2020. He was formally charged with murder on 29 April 2020 and went on trial for the crime in June, along with his alleged accomplice Markus Hartmann. Ernst was convicted on 28 January 2021 and sentenced to life imprisonment. The court decreed a "special gravity" of guilt for Ernst, extending his parole ineligibility. As such, he will have to serve a minimum of 22 years in prison before becoming eligible for parole, rather than the 15-to-life sentence typically imposed for murder in German law. As German law allows up to 25 years as a minimum term, it was considered near the high end of gravity. Markus Hartmann was acquitted of accessory to murder but convicted of illegal gun possession, for which he received a suspended sentence.

== Controversies ==
On 22 February 2025, at his final campaign event on the eve of Germany's federal elections, conservative leader Friedrich Merz criticized protesters against far right political party AfD and Merz's center-right CDU. The nationwide protests began following Merz's move in January 2025 to table a motion in parliament, calling for Germany to turn away significantly more migrants at its border. The motion had attained a majority due to the AfD voting alongside the CDU. In this campaign speech, Merz said, "I ask all those who walk around out there, Antifa and "Gegen Rechts" [Against the Right]: Where were they, when Walter Lübcke was murdered in Kassel by a right-wing extremist?" His statement drew criticism on social media, as Merz attempted to invisiblize a rally of up to 10,000 people, which had been held in Kassel right after the murder, to protest against right-wing extremism, hatred, and hate speech.

== See also ==
- Murder of Jo Cox, a similar assassination
