= Values Union =

German political party

Values Union WerteUnion
- Abbreviation: WU
- Chairperson: vacant
- Spokesperson: Martin Lohmann
- Deputy chairs: Alexander Mitsch, Albert Weiler
- Founder: Alexander Mitsch
- Founded: 24 March 2017 (association); 17 February 2024 (party)
- Split from: Christian Democratic Union of Germany
- Headquarters: Berlin
- Youth wing: Junge Werteunion
- Membership (2024): 1,386 to 4,000
- Ideology: National conservatism; Economic liberalism; Right-wing populism
- Political position: Right-wing
- Colours: Navy blue Orange
- Bundestag: 0 / 630
- Bundesrat: 0 / 69
- State Parliaments: 1 / 1,891
- European Parliament: 0 / 96
- Heads of State Governments: 0 / 16

Website
- werteunion.de

The Values Union (German: WerteUnion, WU) is a German political party founded on 17 February 2024 by transforming a seven-year-old registered association with the same name. According to its own information, the Values Union had around 4,000 members in 2022, with about 3,000 also being members of the Christian Democratic Union of Germany.

== History ==
The Values Union (WU) was founded in 2017 and mostly included the members of the Christian Democratic Union (CDU) seeking to reestablish their party's conservative roots. The formation was motivated by the same shift to the right in the CDU that eventually forced Angela Merkel out of the leadership, due to her flirting with Keynesianism and social democracy, to the detriment of the "tough market radicalism of the CDU/CSU", as well as associated electorate losses to the right-wing Alternative for Germany (AfD).

The CDU's executive committee did not recognize WU as a party subdivision, with critics accusing it of being close to the AfD. The group, which was quite small at the time, argued against Merkel's approaches to the Euro rescue and the 2015 European migrant crisis. One of the founders, Hans-Georg Maaßen, refused to rule out potential coalitions with AfD in the medium-term. The 2019 resolution of the presidium and executive committee of the CDU related to the murder of Walter Lübcke indirectly accused Maaßen and WU of being complicit: "Anyone who supports the AfD must know that they are poisoning the social climate and brutalizing the political discourse". The federal leadership of the CDU initiated expulsion of Maaßen in February 2023.

The deputy federal chairwoman and North Rhine-Westphalia state leader of WU, Simone Baum, took part in a secret networking meeting between the AfD and other right-wing extremists on 2023. At the meeting, the right-wing extremist participants discussed how an expulsion of migrants and people who think differently politically would be possible. The CDU initiated party expulsion proceedings against Baum, and the city of Cologne terminated her employment with immediate effect, likewise due to her participation at the secret meeting.

In the beginning of 2024, Maaßen announced a vote among the association members in order to turn WU into a political party that would take an anti-immigration stance. At a general meeting on 20 January in Erfurt, its members voted to form a new party, with a plan to participate in the upcoming September 2024 regional elections in Thuringia, Saxony, and Brandenburg. Maaßen had said earlier that the new party would cooperate with all parties that support its program and "are ready for a change in policy in Germany". WU got 0.28% of the vote in the 2024 Saxony state election, 0.56% in Thuringia, and 0.26% in Brandenburg.

AfD Bundestag member Dirk Spaniel joined WU in January 2025, giving it representation in the federal parliament. Spaniel will not run for re-election.

== Election results ==
=== Federal parliament (Bundestag) ===
Election	Leader	Constituency		Party list		Seats	+/–	Status
Election	Leader	Votes	%	Votes	%	Seats	+/–	Status
2025	Hans-Georg Maaßen	2,844 (#20)	0.01	6,803 (#25)	0.01	0 / 630	New	Extra-parliamentary

=== State ===
State	Year	Votes	%	Seats	±	Government
Saxony	2024	6,474	0.28 (#14)	0 / 120	N/A	Extra-parliamentary
Thuringia	2024	6,780	0.56 (#10)	0 / 88	N/A	Extra-parliamentary
Brandenburg	2024	3,877	0.26 (#12)	0 / 88	N/A	Extra-parliamentary
Baden-Württemberg	2026	11,304	0.21 (#14)	0 / 157	N/A	Extra-parliamentary

== Party ==
The chair of WU is Hans-Georg Maaßen, the former head of the Federal Office for the Protection of the Constitution. Since January 2024, he has been monitored by his former colleagues.

Shortly after the party was founded, a dispute over direction and power struggles began. Maaßen said that he would ideally like to form a coalition with the CDU, which he called the "premium partner" for WU. He also said he was happy about the possible demise of the AfD. This caused discord within the party. The entrepreneur Markus Krall and ex-AfD member Max Otte were involved in founding the party. After less than a month, they announced their resignation. Both criticized the party's unclear program and political direction and its protagonists' overconfidence. They also complained that the party's distance from the AfD was too great.

=== Political stances ===
Politically, observers place the Values Union between the CDU and the AfD. It has been described as Germany's Tea Party. Prior to turning into a party, it had no official party affiliation, and its role within the CDU/CSU was highly controversial. In the 2018 leadership election, it supported Friedrich Merz.

== Structure ==
Federal presidency:

- Alexander Mitsch (March 2017 – May 2021)
- Max Otte (May 2021 – January 2022),
- Hans-Georg Maaßen (since January 2023), former president of the Federal Office for the Protection of the Constitution

Former members:

- Alexander Mitsch, co-founder and first federal president of WU
- Werner Josef Patzelt, political scientist and university professor

== Sources ==
- Grotz, Florian; Schroeder, Wolfgang (2023). "Political Parties and the Party System". The Political System of Germany. Cham: Springer International Publishing. pp. 183–236. doi:10.1007/978-3-031-32480-2_6. ISBN 978-3-031-32479-6.
- Oppelland, Torsten (2020). "Die CDU: Volkspartei am Ende der Ära Merkel". Die Parteien nach der Bundestagswahl 2017 (in German). Wiesbaden: Springer Fachmedien Wiesbaden. pp. 43–69. doi:10.1007/978-3-658-29771-8_2. ISBN 978-3-658-29770-1.
