= Stefan Schard =

German politician (born 1974)

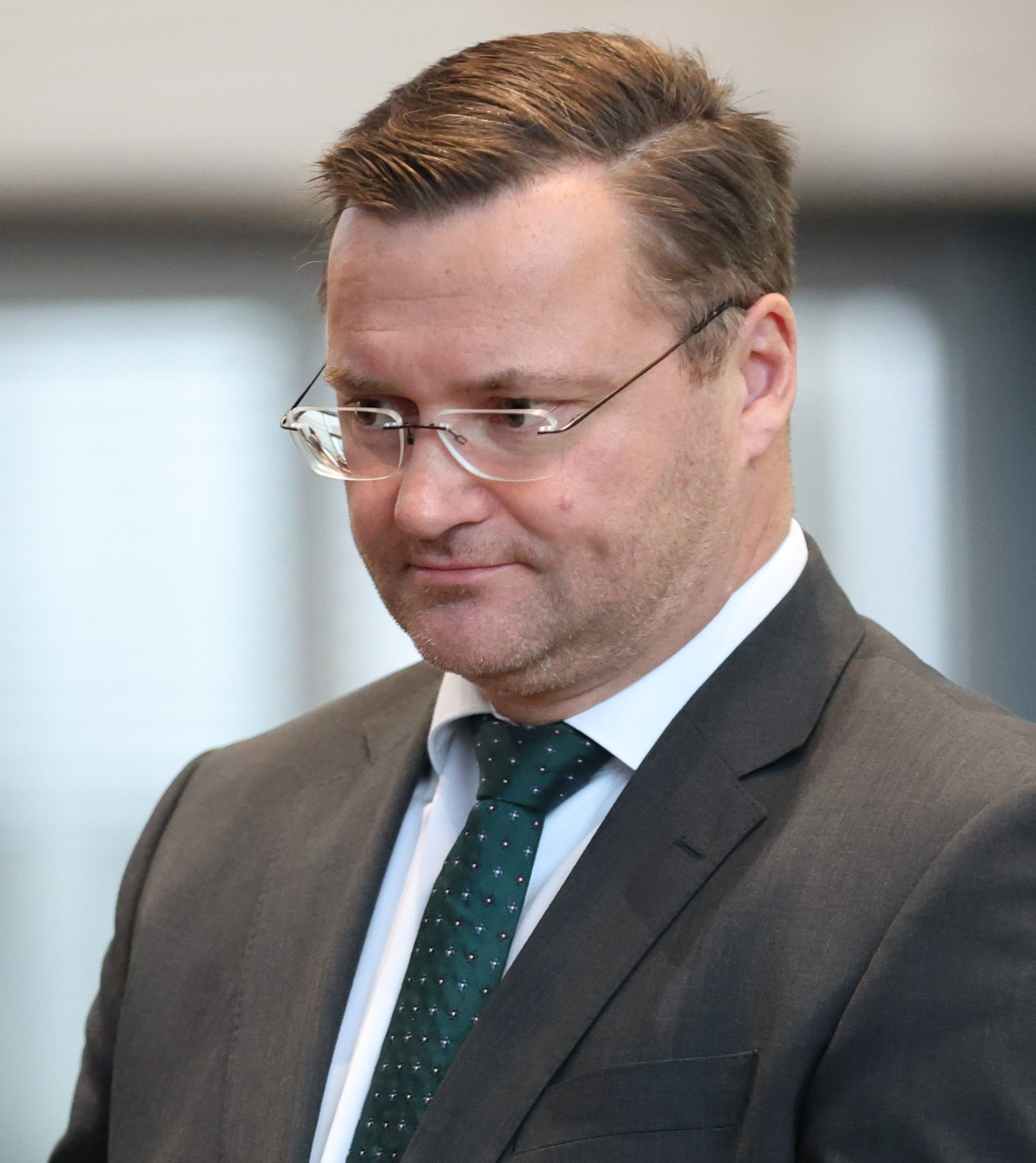
- Schard in 2024

Member of the Landtag of Thuringia
- Incumbent
- Assumed office 26 November 2019
- Preceded by: Manfred Scherer
- Constituency: Kyffhäuserkreis I – Eichsfeld III

Personal details
- Born: 1974 (age 51–52)
- Party: Christian Democratic Union

Stefan Schard (born 1974) is a German politician serving as a member of the Landtag of Thuringia since 2019. He has served as chairman of the Christian Democratic Union in the Kyffhäuserkreis since 2018.
