= Mark Hauptmann =

German politician

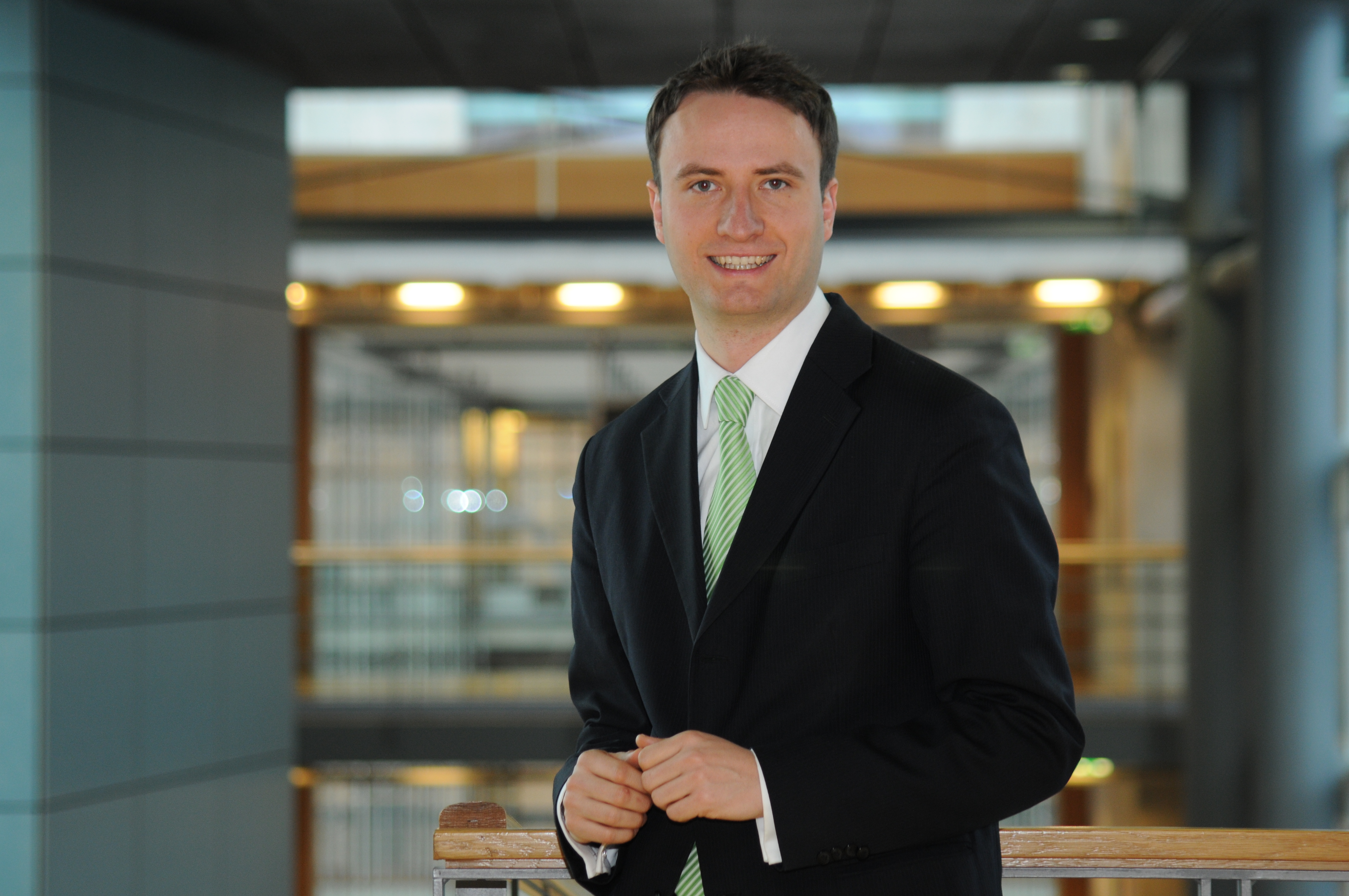
- Hauptmann in 2013

Member of the Bundestag for Suhl – Schmalkalden-Meiningen – Hildburghausen
- In office 22 October 2013 – 19 March 2021
- Preceded by: Jens Petermann
- Succeeded by: Kristina Nordt

Personal details
- Born: 29 April 1984 (age 42) Weimar, Thuringia, East Germany (now Germany)
- Citizenship: German
- Party: CDU
- Education: University of Jena; Kansai Gaidai University; Yale University
- Occupation: Politician

Mark Lars Carsten Hauptmann (born 29 April 1984) was a German politician of the Christian Democratic Union of Germany (CDU) who served as a member of the German Bundestag from 2013 until 2021.

== Early life and education ==
After receiving his Senior Highschool Degree in 2003 in the city of Suhl, Hauptmann studied political science, business communication, economic and social history at Friedrich Schiller University in Jena (FSU), Kansai Gaidai University in Osaka, Japan, and Yale University in New Haven, USA. During his studies he was granted scholarships by the Konrad Adenauer Foundation and the Japan Student Services Organization (JASSO).

Following his graduation in 2009, Hauptmann started working as head of office and parliamentary assistant to Christian Hirte, MP (CDU) at the German Bundestag in Berlin. Additionally, he became a visiting lecturer to the University of Erfurt (2010) and also to the Friedrich-Schiller University in Jena (2011), where he was teaching political science.

Hauptmann worked at the European Parliament in Brussels, Belgium, for the Konrad Adenauer Foundation's office in Beijing, China, as well as the Thuringia's State Ministry of Transportation, Construction and Economic Development. With Kairos Communication he also started his own business.

Hauptmann is a member of the Evangelical Church in Germany.

== Political career ==
In 1999 Hauptmann joined the youth organization of the Christian Democratic Union, the Young Union (JU). There, he chaired the JU Suhl and served as deputy chair of JU's regional group for the Rhön-Rennsteig area, among others. In 2005, he was elected a board member of Junge Union in the State of Thuringia. He was chairman of the permanent workshop on European and International Affairs. On federal level, he represented JU Thuringia until 2012. Since then, he became a member of the federal board of the Young Union and was appointed chairman of JU's International Commission on Foreign, European and Security Affairs until 2014.

Joining the CDU in 2003, Hauptmann soon got elected to the board of the CDU in Suhl and joined the CDU Thuringia' state committee on European Affairs.

In the 2009 European elections, Hauptmann ran for a seat as participant of the CDU's state list for Thuringia.

=== Member of the Bundestag, 2013–2021 ===
Hauptmann was unanimously elected CDU direct candidate for the constituency 197 (Suhl - Schmalkalden-Meiningen - Hildburghausen) for the 2013 German elections. With 42% of the votes, he won his constituency and became a directly elected Member of the German Bundestag.

Hauptmann was a member of the Committee on Economic Affairs and Energy as well as member of its Subcommittee on Regional Economic Policy and ERP Economic Plans. In this capacity, he served as his parliamentary group’s rapporteur on the annual budget of the Federal Ministry for Economic Affairs and Energy, the economic reconstruction of eastern Germany and social policy. He was furthermore a deputy member of the Committee on Foreign Affairs and the German delegation to the NATO Parliamentary Assembly as well as member of the Subcommittee on Civil Crisis Prevention, Conflict Management, and Coordinated Response.

In addition to his committee assignments, Hauptmann chaired the German-Belarusian Parliamentary Friendship Group from 2018 until 2021.

=== "Azerbaijan affair" allegations and resignation ===
In March 2021 several Bundestag members of the ruling CDU/CSU coalition became subjects of criminal investigations on the initial suspicion of corruption, for receiving payments from the Azerbaijani Laundromat money laundering scheme, while others were implicated in allegations of corrupt lobbying practices known as “Caviar diplomacy” in the European Council or what became known as the “Azerbaijan affair” (German: Aserbaidschan-Affäre) scandal in Germany.

In March 2021, magazine Der Spiegel reported that the Azerbaijani embassy in Berlin paid €16,744 to advertise a shopping weekend in Baku in a local newspaper that Hauptmann publishes in the state of Thuringia. According to the report, the payment was made after Hauptmann had worked for years to establish cordial ties with Azerbaijan, consistently siding with the country despite its controversial human rights record. Shortly after the Der Spiegel story, Hauptmann resigned from his parliamentary seat. He claimed that he did nothing wrong but decided to step down to protect his fiancée and children from public harassment.

== Political positions ==
In June 2017, Hauptmann voted against his parliamentary group’s majority and in favor of Germany’s introduction of same-sex marriage.

In 2019, Hauptmann joined fellow CDU lawmakers – including Roderich Kiesewetter and Norbert Röttgen – in co-signing an op-ed in Handelsblatt, calling on Chancellor Angela Merkel to keep Chinese telecom company Huawei out of Germany's 5G network, citing national security reasons.

== Honors and awards ==
Hauptmann is a member of the Jena Debate Society. In 2006, he won the German national debate tournament and became vice champion in 2007.
