= 2022 German presidential election =

- 13 February 2022
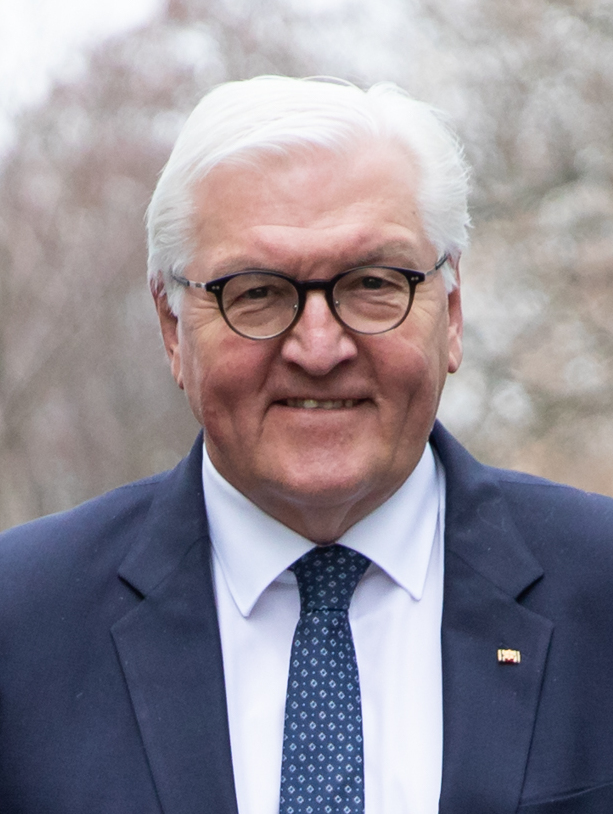

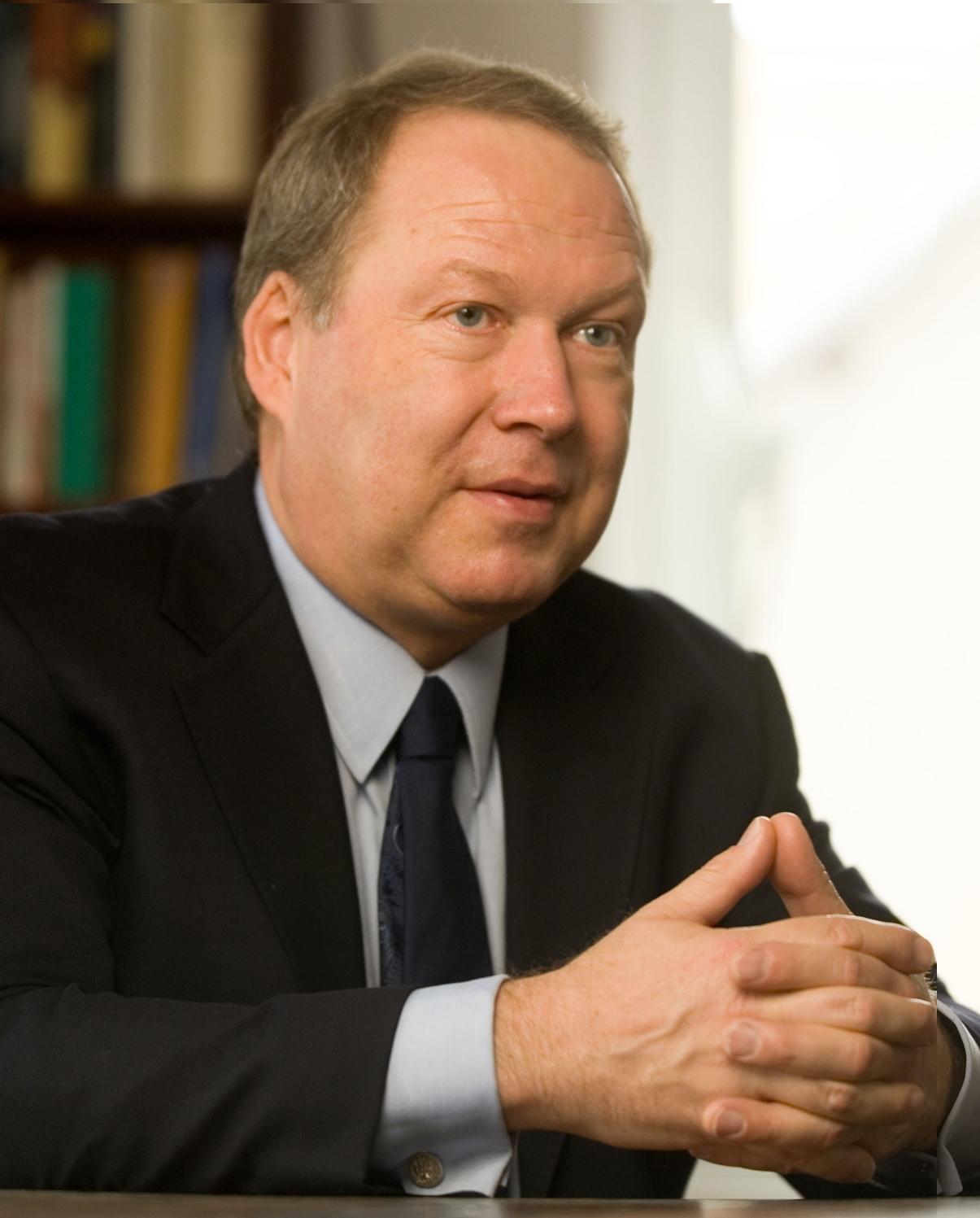

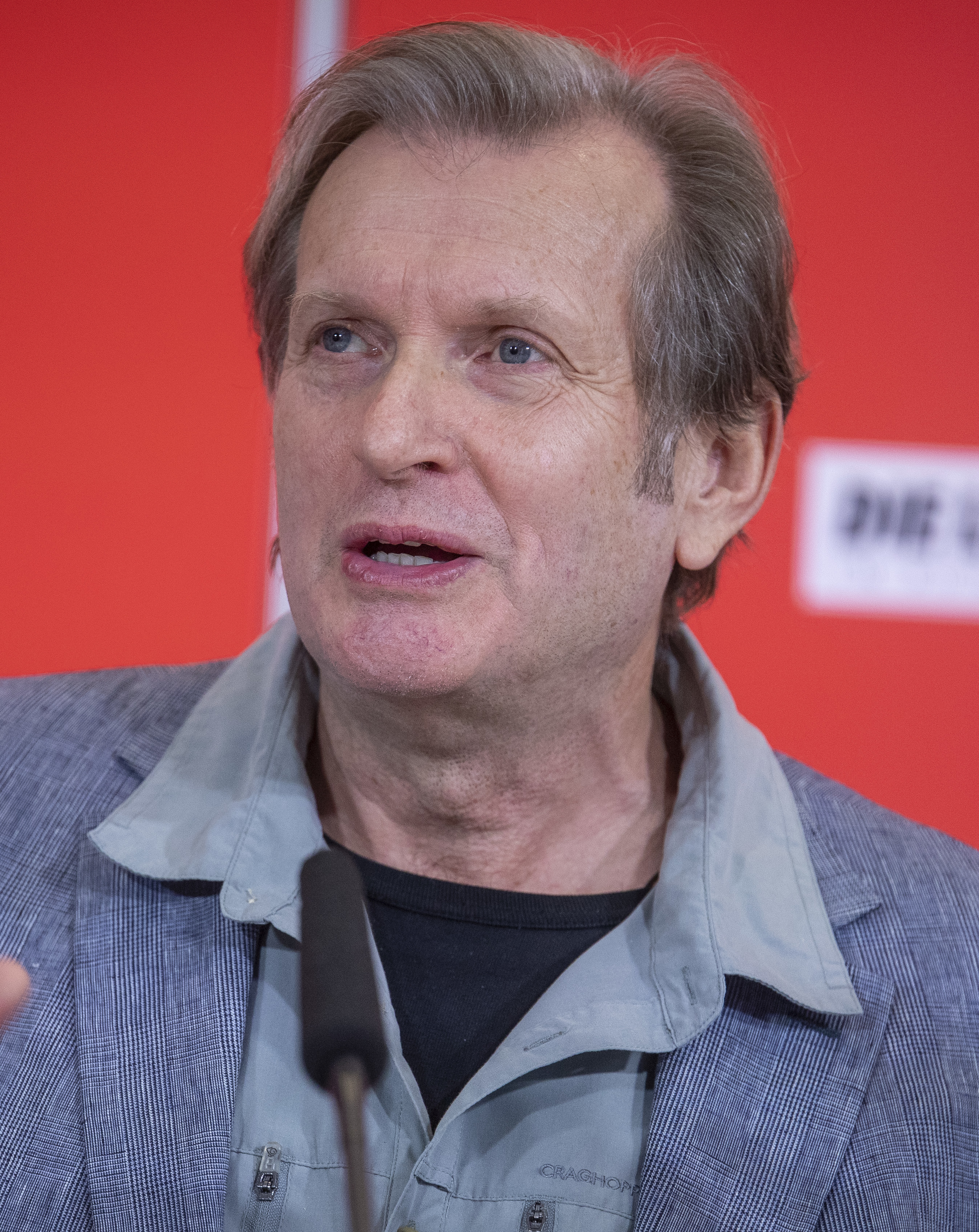
| Nominee | Frank-Walter Steinmeier | Max Otte |
| Party | SPD | CDU (Note: Max Otte was not supported by his party and a party exclusion procedure was initiated because of his candidacy. Otte's party membership was formally revoked after the election in August 2022.) |
| Electoral vote | 1,045 | 140 |
| Percentage | 78.04% | 10.45% |
| Nominators | SPD, CDU/CSU, Grüne, FDP, SSW | AfD |
| Nominee | Gerhard Trabert | Stefanie Gebauer |
| Party | Independent | FW |
| Electoral vote | 96 | 58 |
| Percentage | 7.17% | 4.33% |
| Nominators | Left | FW, BVB/FW |
President before election
Frank-Walter Steinmeier
SPD
Elected President
Frank-Walter Steinmeier
SPD

The 2022 German presidential election, officially the 17th Federal Convention was held on 13 February 2022.

Because of the COVID-19 pandemic and the high number of delegates, the meeting took place in the Paul Löbe House, spread over several floors, unlike its usual location in the plenary hall of the Bundestag.

Frank-Walter Steinmeier became the first Social Democrat to be re-elected as president.

== Background ==
The German Basic Law, the Grundgesetz, mandates that presidential elections must be held no later than thirty days before the sitting President's term ends, unless the presidency falls vacant prematurely.

On 19 March 2017 Frank-Walter Steinmeier of the Social Democratic Party, who was elected by the 16th Federal Convention on 12 February 2017, entered office and started his first five-year term as president. Therefore, the next Federal Convention could not convene later than 16 February 2022. The Bundestag's Council of Elders scheduled the 17th Federal Convention for 13 February 2022.

== Composition of the Federal Convention ==
The Federal Convention consists of all the members of the current Bundestag (736 members) and an equal number of state electors, allocated to the sixteen states of Germany in proportion to their population. The state electors are elected by the state parliaments.

The composition of the Federal Convention:

| Party | Bundestag members | State electors | Total electors | Percentage |
|---|---|---|---|---|
| SPD | 206 | 185 | 391 | 26.56% |
| CDU | 152 | 199 | 351 | 23.84% |
| Grüne | 118 | 115 | 233 | 15.83% |
| FDP | 92 | 62 | 154 | 10.46% |
| AfD | 80 | 72 | 152 | 10.33% |
| CSU | 45 | 49 | 94 | 6.39% |
| Die Linke | 39 | 32 | 71 | 4.82% |
| FW | 0 | 18 | 18 | 1.22% |
| SSW | 1 | 1 | 2 | 0.14% |
| LKR | 0 | 1 | 1 | 0.07% |
| Other | 3 | 2 | 5 | 0.34% |
| Total | 736 | 736 | 1472 | 100% |

As is common for the state-nominated delegates of the constitutional convention, a number of non-politicians - some of them celebrities - are nominated by various parties. During the 17th Federal Convention, virologists Sandra Ciesek and Christian Drosten are both among the members as is infectious disease specialist Marylyn Addo, all of whom came to broader public prominence during the COVID-19 pandemic. In Baden-Württemberg, the SPD and FDP (both in opposition at the state level) agreed to nominate a joint list with 13 members proposed by the SPD and 12 by the FDP.

== Candidates ==
Every member of the Federal Convention (members of the Bundestag and state electors, once they are elected by their respective state parliament) can propose candidates for the presidency. It is required that the President be a German citizen and at least 40 years old. Every candidate has to declare their consent to running. Candidates can be proposed before the Federal Convention and (theoretically) during the convention before every ballot. If the president-elect is a member of a legislature or a government at the federal or state level, they have to resign from that office before the start of their term. A sitting president is not allowed to run for a third consecutive term.

=== Declared candidates ===
- Frank-Walter Steinmeier (SPD), President of Germany (since 2017), former Vice Chancellor of Germany (2007–2009), former Federal Minister for Foreign Affairs (2005–2009 and 2013–2017), was constitutionally eligible for reelection; on 28 May 2021 he declared his candidacy for a second term. The leaders of SPD, Alliance 90/The Greens, FDP, CDU/CSU and SSW all expressed their support for Steinmeier.
- Gerhard Trabert (independent, nominated by The Left), professor of social medicine and social psychiatry at the RheinMain University of Applied Sciences since 2009. He did not receive any endorsement other than that of The Left.
- Max Otte (CDU, nominated by AfD), economist, publicist, political activist, and former professor of quantitative and qualitative business analysis and diagnosis at the University of Graz (2011–2016). He did not receive any endorsement other than that of AfD. In reaction to Otte accepting the nomination, the CDU suspended his party membership. On 3 August 2022, some five months after the election, Otte was formally expelled from the CDU as a direct result of accepting the nomination.
- Stefanie Gebauer (FW), astrophysicist and chairwoman of Kremmen city council. She did not receive any endorsement other than that of FW and BVB/FW.
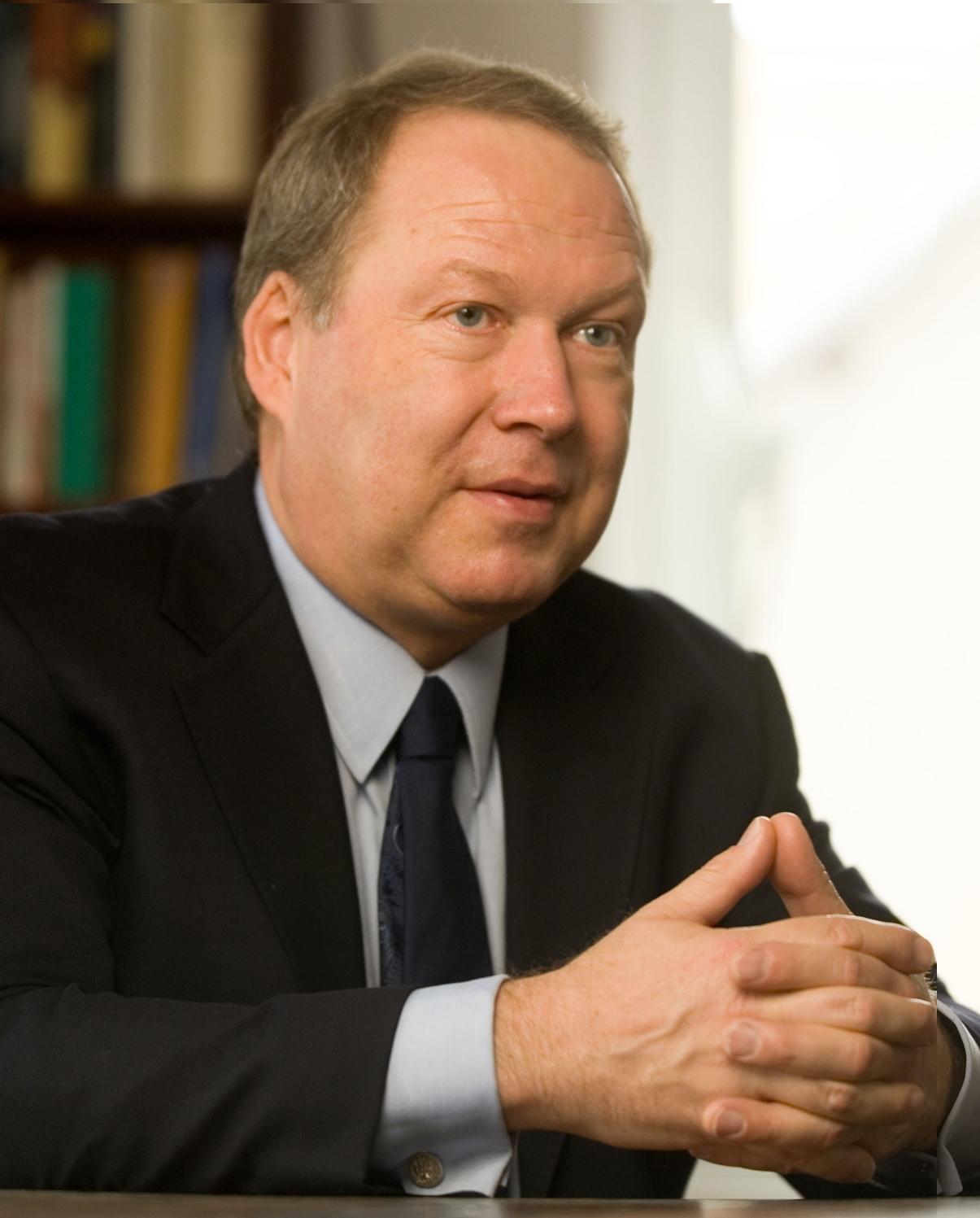
Economist
Max Otte
from North Rhine-Westphalia

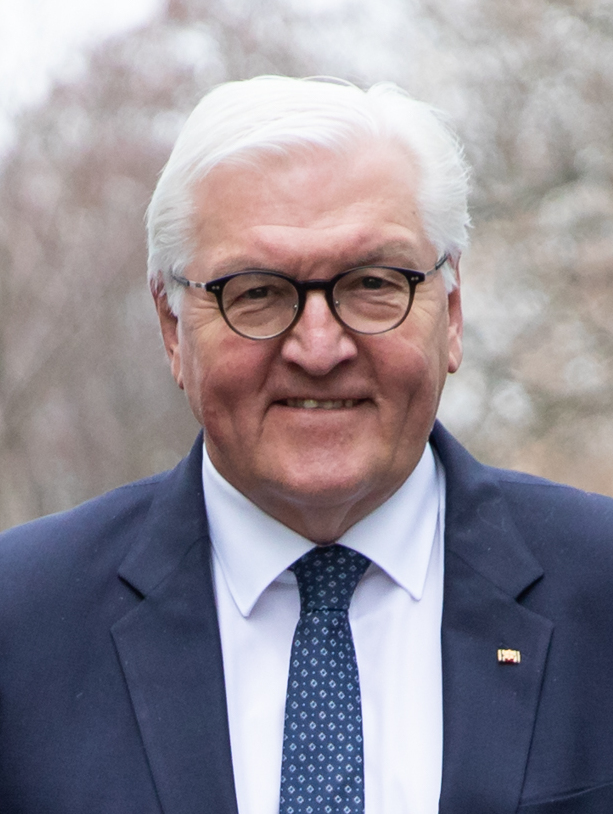
President of Germany
Frank-Walter Steinmeier
from Brandenburg

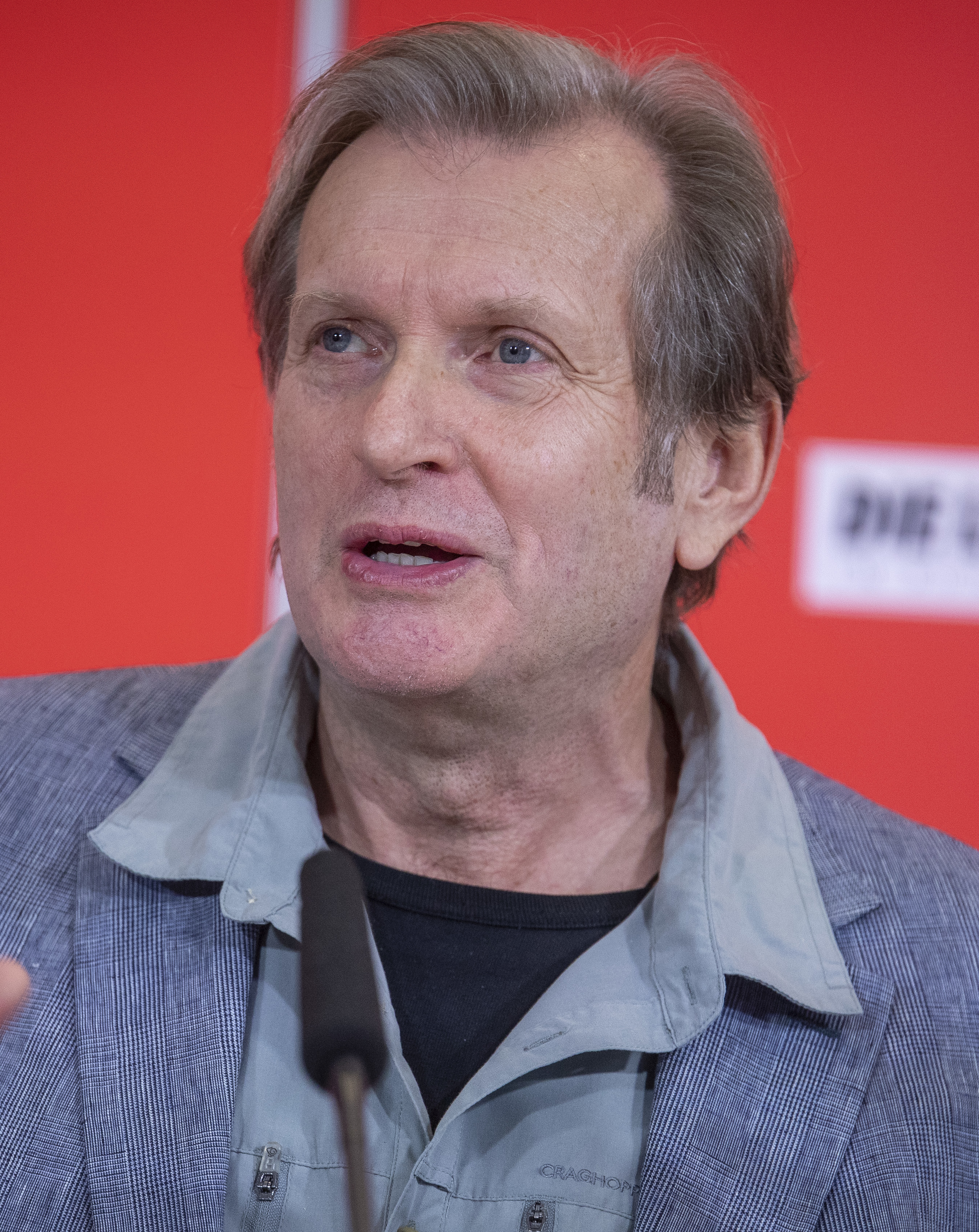
Gerhard Trabert
from Rhineland-Palatinate

None of the candidates were members of the Federal Convention themselves. For constitutional reasons, Steinmeier, as the incumbent president, was not permitted to serve as a member of the Federal Convention; Gebauer, Otte, and Trabert were neither members of the Bundestag nor had they been elected as state electors by a state parliament.

== Results ==
Results
| Candidate | Party | Supporting party | First | |
| Candidate | Party | Supporting party | Votes | % |
|---|---|---|---|---|
| Frank-Walter Steinmeier | SPD | SPD, CDU, CSU, Alliance 90/The Greens, FDP and SSW | 1,045 | 78.04 |
| Max Otte | CDU (suspended) | AfD | 140 | 10.45 |
| Gerhard Trabert | Independent | The Left | 96 | 7.17 |
| Stefanie Gebauer | Free Voters | Free Voters and BVB/FW | 58 | 4.33 |
| Valid votes | | | 1,339 | 99.11 |
| Invalid votes | | | 12 | 0.89 |
| Total | | | 1,437 | 100 |
| Abstentions | | | 86 | 5.84 |
| Abstents | | | 35 | 2.38 |
| Eligible voters/Turnout | | | 1,472 | 91.78 |
