= Robert Teske =

German politician (born 1990)

Member of the Bundestag
- Incumbent
- Assumed office March 2025
- Preceded by: Frank Ullrich
- Constituency: Suhl – Schmalkalden-Meiningen – Hildburghausen – Sonneberg

Personal details
- Born: 1990 (age 35–36) Brandenburg an der Havel
- Party: Alternative for Germany

Robert Teske (born 8 March 1990 in Brandenburg an der Havel) is a German politician who was elected as a member of the Bundestag in 2025. He has served as chief of staff to Björn Höcke since 2019.
