= Walter Lübcke =

German politician (1953–2019)

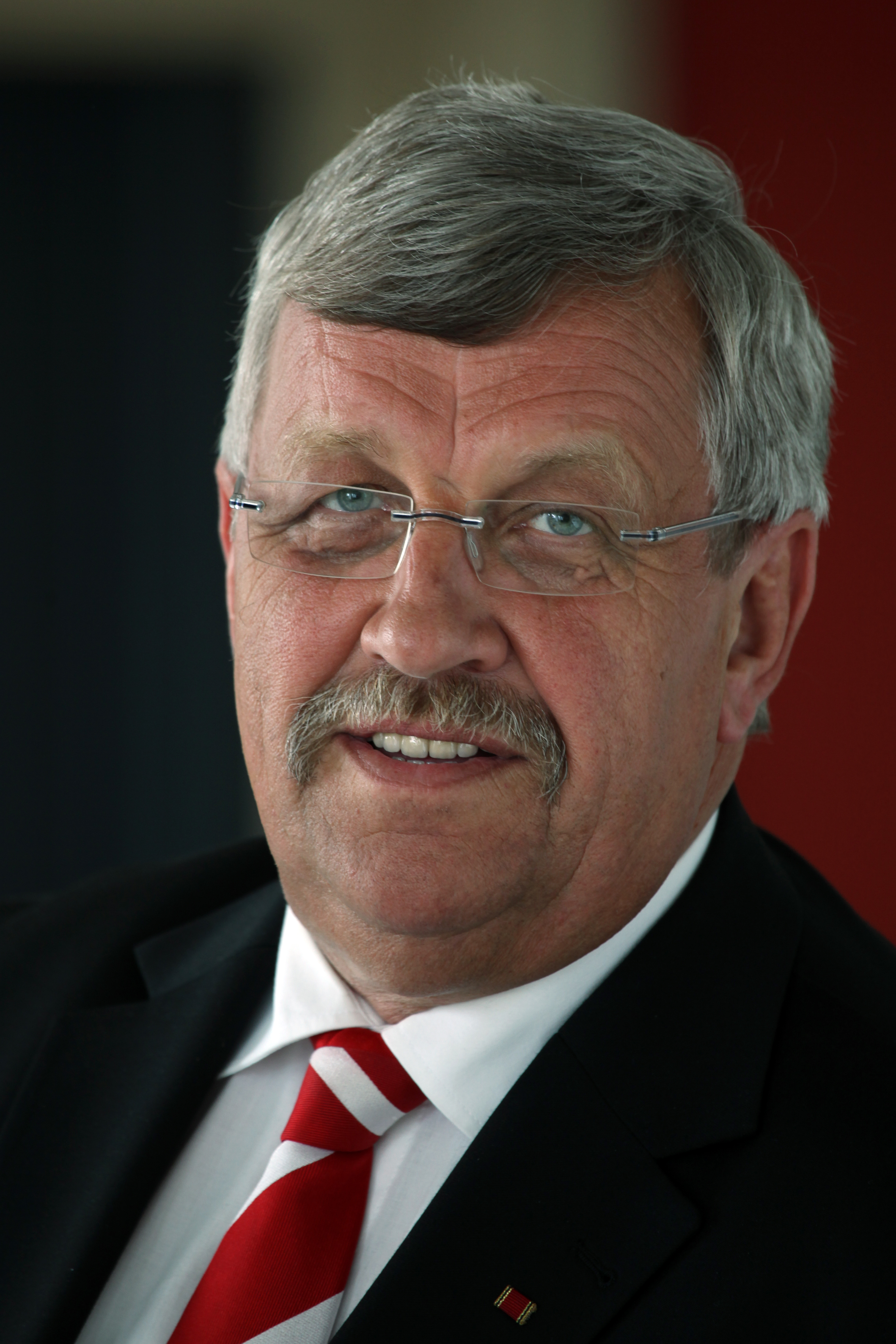
- Lübcke in 2009

President of the Regierungsbezirk of Kassel
- In office 20 May 2009 – 2 June 2019
- Appointed by: Volker Bouffier
- Vice President: Hermann-Josef Klüber
- Preceded by: Lutz Klein
- Succeeded by: Hermann-Josef Klüber

Member of the Landtag of Hesse
- In office 5 April 2008 – 5 February 2009
- Preceded by: multi-member district
- Succeeded by: multi-member district
- Constituency: CDU List
- In office 5 April 2003 – 5 April 2008
- Preceded by: Rolf Karwecki
- Succeeded by: Brigitte Hofmeyer
- Constituency: Kassel-Land I
- In office 5 April 1999 – 5 April 2003
- Preceded by: multi-member district
- Succeeded by: multi-member district
- Constituency: CDU List

Personal details
- Born: 22 August 1953 Bad Wildungen, West Germany (now Germany)
- Died: 2 June 2019 (aged 65) Istha, Wolfhagen, Germany
- Cause of death: Assassination by gunshot
- Party: Christian Democratic Union
- Spouse: Irmgard Braun-Lübcke
- Children: 2
- Education: University of Kassel
- Occupation: Politician
- Awards: Wilhelm Leuschner Medal (2019, posthumously)

Walter Lübcke (22 August 1953 – 2 June 2019) was a German local politician in Hesse and a member of the Christian Democratic Union (CDU). He served as a President of the Regierungsbezirk of Kassel in 2009 until his assassination in 2019 by a neo-Nazi extremist.

Stephan Ernst was arrested on June 15, 2019 and confessed to the crime 6 days later.

== Early life and education ==
After attending primary and secondary school in Edertal, Lübcke finished a two-year vocational training in Bad Wildungen in 1969 to briefly work in a local bank afterwards. During his voluntary military service between 1975 and 1983, he completed his human resources management training and later worked as an assistant in the press office of the art exhibition documenta 7. Concurrently, Lübcke studied at the University of Kassel from 1981 to 1986, graduating with a degree in economics. In 1991, he successfully defended his doctoral dissertation on "The early economic planning attempts in the Soviet Union: 1924–1928; Socialism between utopia and pragmatism".

Walter Lübcke was member of the Evangelical Church in Germany.

== Career ==
Lübcke served as the municipal-oversight president of the governmental district (Regierungsbezirk) of Kassel, one of three in the federal state of Hesse, for 10 years.

He was known for his pro-migrant views. He received death threats after stating at a public gathering that people were free to leave the country if they opposed helping those claiming asylum.

== Death ==
On 2 June 2019, Lübcke was found dead on the terrace of his residence in the village of Istha. He had been shot in the head with a Rossi revolver at close range. On 15 June 2019, 45-year-old suspect Stephan Ernst was arrested. Ernst was known to have held extreme right-wing political views and had links to the far-right National Democratic Party of Germany (NPD) and the German branch of the British neo-Nazi terrorist group Combat 18 (C18). Ernst had been previously convicted for knife and bomb attacks against targets connected to ethnic minorities in Germany. In 2021 Ernst was sentenced to life imprisonment.

=== Aftermath ===
Following the death of Lübcke, the city of Kassel held a rally with up to 10,000 people attending who held banners that said in German "#FlagForDiversity" and "Together we are strong" with the following statements delivered by Bishop Martin Hein and Thomas Bockelmann, director of the Staatstheater Kassel that said "Whoever violates the dignity of people, in violence or in words, puts himself outside our democratic community, there are no ifs, ands or buts" and "cowardly people who in the anonymity of the internet wanted to feel powerful". Two others, Elmar J. and Markus H. were arrested on suspicion of ties to the killer.

An investigation by the Federal Office for the Protection of the Constitution (BfV) found that a doomsday prepper network Nordkreuz (German: Northern Cross) had ammunition, firearms, and body bags, as well as "kill lists" for politicians after acquisition of a database of 25,000 names, which they shared on the messaging app Telegram.

== See also ==
- Murder of Jo Cox, a British Member of Parliament (MP), by neo-Nazi Thomas Mair in 2016
