= Federal Convention (Germany) =

Federal Convention Bundesversammlung
- 18th Federal Convention will convene on 30 January 2027

Type
- Type: Electoral college
- Established: 1949

Leadership
- President (Note: President of the Bundestag (ex officio)): Julia Klöckner

Website
- bundestag.de

The Federal Convention (German: Bundesversammlung [ˈbʊndəsfɛɐ̯ˌzamlʊŋ]), is a non-permanent constitutional body in the institutional framework of the Federal Republic of Germany. It is convened every five years solely for the purpose of electing the President of Germany.

The Federal Convention consists of all 630 members of the federal parliament (Bundestag), and the same number of state electors, who are allocated proportionally to the sixteen German states on the basis of the number of inhabitants eligible to vote on federal level. Those state delegations are elected by the state parliaments ad hoc. Unlike the federal half of the Convention, the state half is not limited to members of state parliaments, but may also include people from other walks of life.

Incumbent president Frank-Walter Steinmeier (SPD) has been elected in 2017 and to a second consecutive term in 2022, thus is ineligible in 2027. For the upcoming 30 January 2027 German presidential election, several parties have called for a woman to be elected president. On 6 November 2026, the party with the most delegates, CDU/CSU, has nominated Ilse Aigner, member of the Christian Social Union of Bavaria (CSU) who serves as President of the Landtag of Bavaria. SPD and Alliance 90/The Greens have endorsed her, thus she is likely to win over 800 of 1260 votes.

== Convening the Federal Convention ==
The Federal Convention is convened by the incumbent president of the Bundestag in due course. Normally, this takes place during the last months of a sitting president's current term of office. However, the Convention must convene no later than thirty days before the end of the term, with the state parliaments needing sufficient time between the announcement and the meeting to elect the state delegations. The state electors are elected by the state parliaments through a list voting system. In practice, this means that the composition of the state delegations is proportional to the distribution of seats in the respective state parliaments. However, since the list voting must be conducted by secret ballot, deviations may (and sometimes do) occur.

If the term of office of a president ends prematurely through resignation, death or impeachment, the Federal Convention must meet within thirty days. This has happened two times so far (2010, after the resigantion of Horst Köhler, and 2012, after the resignation of Christian Wulff). Heinrich Lübke's resignation (1968/69) is a special case: he announced in October 1968 that he would resign with effect from June 30, 1969, in order to enable the Federal Convention to convene before the start of the Bundestag election campaign in the fall of that year, when his scheduled term would have ended. Since the resignation was announced about nine months in advance, the Federal Convention could be held as usual before the (early) end of his term of office.

== Procedure ==
The President of the Bundestag chairs the Federal Convention ex officio. At the start of the session, he or she usually delivers a short address. The Federal Convention must then decide standing rules. In theory, the Federal Convention is a constitutional body of its own and has an absolute power of self organisation. In practice however, at every Federal Convention to date, it has been decided that the current version of the Bundestag’s rules of procedure shall be applied by analogy, with some minor modifications. This is followed by the election of secretaries, although in practice the current secretaries of the Bundestag are usually elected en bloc. This is immediately followed by the election, for which every member of the Convention may propose candidates; however, nominations require the consent of the nominee in order to be accepted. In the first two rounds of voting, an absolute majority of all members of the Federal Convention is required for a successful election. From the third round onwards, a plurality of votes is sufficient. Before each ballot, nominees may withdraw their candidacy or new candidates may be proposed. If a person has been elected in accordance with these rules, they have two days to accept the election; otherwise, it is deemed to have been rejected. In the latter case, too, further ballots would have to take place. Once an elected candidate accepts the election, the Federal Convention is dissolved.

The new president takes office, after the term of his predecessor has ended. Only in the case of a vacancy (e.g. after the resignation of the predecessor, as happened in 2010 and 2012), the elected person takes office immediately upon acceptance of the election. Irrespective of this, a newly elected president does not take the oath of office before the Federal Convention, but after taking office in a joint session of the Bundestag and the Bundesrat.

There is no constitutional requirement regarding the duration of the election, except that the Federal Convention must convene no later than thirty days before the end of the incumbent President’s term of office (or thirty days after the premature end of that term). The Convention may adjourn thereafter, and also between individual rounds of voting, at its own discretion. Should no successor be elected by the end of the President’s term of office, the President of the Bundesrat, as the President’s constitutional deputy, would initially take charge of the affairs of state on an acting basis until the Convention has elected a President, who would then assume office immediately upon accepting the election. In practice, however, every Federal Convention to date has successfully elected a President on the very day it convened.

== Membership ==
The Federal Convention includes the entire membership of the Bundestag, and an equal number of state electors; the total number of state electors is distributed onto the 16 German states in proportion to their population (with regard only to citizens who are eligible to vote on federal level).

These delegetionas are elected by the state parliaments. According to federal law, every member of a state parliament has one vote. The delegates are elected with lists and proportional vote. Some details are dealt with by the standing orders of the state parliament. In many state parliaments, the members vote on a joint list that mirrors the strengths of the parliamentary groups.

A delegate for the Federal Convention must meet one certain standard: they must also be eligible for a candidacy for the Bundestag. The parliamentary groups sometimes elect delegates who are not politicians. For example, they choose artists, sports persons or other celebrities, or occasionally an ordinary citizen with an unusual story. Examples from 2017 are Joachim Löw, the coach of the national football team, for the Green Party in Baden-Württemberg and Olivia Jones, Germany's most famous drag queen, for the Green Party in Lower Saxony. Semiya Şimşek, daughter of a NSU terror victim, was elected by Die Linke in Thuringia.

== History ==
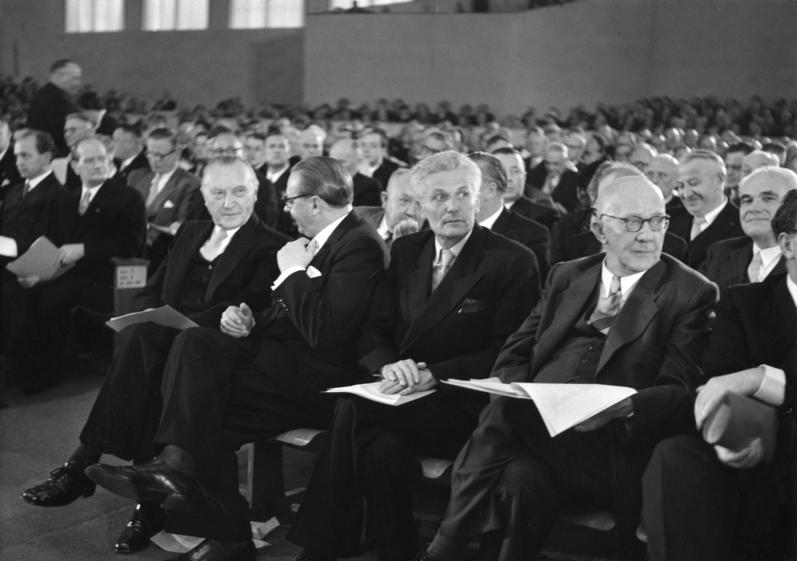
The 1954 convention in the Ostpreußenhalle in Berlin

Since the founding of the Federal Republic in 1949, the Federal Convention has been convened 17 times. The 18th Federal Convention will convene on 30 January 2027. Since 1979, the Federal Convention has traditionally met on 23 May, the anniversary of the Basic Law (1949). This tradition came to an end with the resignation of Horst Koehler (2010).

Election	Date	Site	Ballots	Winner (endorsing parties) (Note: governing parties in bold)	Electoral votes (percentage)	Runner-up (endorsing parties) (Note: governing parties in bold)	Electoral votes (percentage)
1st Federal Convention	12 September 1949	Bonn	2	Theodor Heuss (FDP, CDU, CSU)	416 (51.7%)	Kurt Schumacher (SPD)	312 (38.8%)
2nd Federal Convention	17 July 1954	West Berlin	1	Theodor Heuss (FDP, CDU, CSU, SPD)	871 (85.6%)	Alfred Weber (KPD)	12 (1.2%)
3rd Federal Convention	1 July 1959	West Berlin	2	Heinrich Lübke (CDU, CSU)	526 (50.7%)	Carlo Schmid (SPD)	386 (37.2%)
4th Federal Convention	1 July 1964	West Berlin	1	Heinrich Lübke (CDU, CSU, SPD)	710 (68.1%)	Ewald Bucher (FDP)	123 (11.8%)
5th Federal Convention	5 March 1969	West Berlin	3	Gustav Heinemann (SPD, FDP)	512 (49.4%)	Gerhard Schröder (CDU, CSU, NPD)	506 (48.8%)
6th Federal Convention	15 May 1974	Bonn	1	Walter Scheel (FDP, SPD)	530 (51.2%)	Richard von Weizsäcker (CDU, CSU)	498 (48.1%)
7th Federal Convention	23 May 1979	Bonn	1	Karl Carstens (CDU, CSU)	528 (51%)	Annemarie Renger (SPD)	431 (41.6%)
8th Federal Convention	23 May 1984	Bonn	1	Richard von Weizsäcker (CDU, CSU, FDP, SPD)	832 (80%)	Luise Rinser (Greens)	68 (6.5%)
9th Federal Convention	23 May 1989	Bonn	1	Richard von Weizsäcker (CDU, CSU, FDP, SPD)	881 (84.9%)	None	108 (10.4%) no-votes
10th Federal Convention	23 May 1994	Berlin	3	Roman Herzog (CDU, CSU)	696 (52.6%)	Johannes Rau (SPD)	605 (45.7%)
11th Federal Convention	23 May 1999	Berlin	2	Johannes Rau (SPD, Greens)	690 (51.6%)	Dagmar Schipanski (CDU, CSU)	572 (42.8%)
12th Federal Convention	23 May 2004	Berlin	1	Horst Köhler (CDU, CSU, FDP)	604 (50.1%)	Gesine Schwan (SPD, Greens)	589 (48.9%)
13th Federal Convention	23 May 2009	Berlin	1	Horst Köhler (CDU, CSU, FDP, FW)	613 (50.1%)	Gesine Schwan (SPD, Greens)	503 (41.1%)
14th Federal Convention	30 June 2010	Berlin	3	Christian Wulff (CDU, CSU, FDP)	625 (50.2%)	Joachim Gauck (SPD, Greens)	494 (39.7%)
15th Federal Convention	18 March 2012	Berlin	1	Joachim Gauck (CDU, CSU, FDP, SPD, Greens, Free Voters, SSW)	991 (79.9%)	Beate Klarsfeld (The Left)	126 (10.2%)
16th Federal Convention	12 February 2017	Berlin	1	Frank-Walter Steinmeier (SPD, CDU, CSU, Greens, FDP, SSW)	931 (74.3%)	Christoph Butterwegge (The Left)	128 (10.2%)
17th Federal Convention	13 February 2022	Berlin	1	Frank-Walter Steinmeier (SPD, Greens, FDP, CDU, CSU, SSW)	1045 (72.7%)	Max Otte (AfD)	140 (9.74%)
18th Federal Convention	30 January 2027	Berlin					

=== Venue ===
On 12 September 1949, the first Federal Convention met in Bonn, which served as the capital of the Federal Republic of Germany before reunification with East Germany. From 1954 to 1969 the Federal Convention was convened at the Ostpreußenhalle in Berlin, leading to protests from the German Democratic Republic on each occasion it met. As a consequence, on 5 March 1969, the Soviet Union sent MiG-21 warplanes to fly over the venue in West Berlin.

From 1974 to 1989, the Federal Convention met in the Beethovenhalle in Bonn. Since 1994, the meeting place has been the Reichstag building in Berlin. After the renovation of the Reichstag, the German Bundestag moved to the building in April 1999. Since the meeting of the Federal Convention held in May 1999, the body has convened in the plenary chamber at the Reichstag building, except that the 2022 Federal Convention took place at the Paul-Löbe-Haus in Berlin, with delegates spread over several floors, due to the COVID-19 pandemic.

== See also ==
- Politics of Germany
- Federalism in Germany
- Federal Assembly of Austria
- Federal Assembly of Switzerland
