= List of heads of state of Germany =

This is a list of heads of state of Germany.

== History ==
Germany was ruled by monarchs from the beginning of division of the Frankish Empire in August 843 to the dissolution of the Holy Roman Empire in August 1806. During most of 19th century, independent German principalities were organized into various confederations, such as the Confederation of the Rhine dominated by Napoleon (1806-1813) and the German Confederation created by the Congress of Vienna (1814-1866). The Prussian-led North German Confederation (1866-1871) subsequently morphed into a modern nation state, the German Reich, which was ruled by emperors from 1871 to the collapse of all German monarchies in 1918.

The President of Germany replaced the monarch in 1919. Chancellor Adolf Hitler assumed the duties of head of state as Führer and Chancellor from 1934 until his suicide in April 1945. In 1949, Germany was divided into two states. The Federal President, head of state of West Germany, became head of state for all of Germany following German reunification in 1990.

=== East Frankish kingdom, 843–962 ===
==== Carolingians ====
Seal/Portrait	Name	House	King	Emperor	Ended	Notes
	Louis the German; Ludwig der Deutsche	Carolingian	11 August 843	—	23 August 876	Son of Emperor Louis the Pious and grandson of Charlemagne
	Carloman (Karlmann)	Carolingian	28 August 876	—	22 March 880	Son of Louis the German; ruled in Bavaria; from 877, also King of Italy
	Louis the Younger (Ludwig III. der Jüngere)	Carolingian	28 August 876	—	20 January 882	Son of Louis the German; ruled in East Francia, Saxony; from 880, also Bavaria
	Charles the Fat (Karl III. der Dicke)	Carolingian	28 August 876	12 February 881	11 November 887	Son of Louis the German; ruled in Alemannia, Raetia, from 882 in the entire Eastern Kingdom; from 879, also King of Italy
	Arnulf of Carinthia (Arnulf von Kärnten)	Carolingian	30 November 887	25 April 896	8 December 899	Illegitimate son of Carloman
	Louis the Child (Ludwig IV. das Kind)	Carolingian	21 January 900	—	20/24 September 911	Son of Arnulf of Carinthia

==== Conradine dynasty ====
Seal	Name	House	King	Emperor	Ended	Notes
	Conrad I (Konrad I.)	Conradine (Franconian)	10 November 911	—	23 December 918	Elected by the nobility

==== Ottonian dynasty ====
Seal	Name	House	King	Emperor	Ended	Notes
	Henry I the Fowler (Heinrich I. der Vogler)	Liudolfing (Saxon)	23 April 919	—	2 July 936	Elected by the nobility
	Arnulf the Bad (Arnulf der Böse, Herzog von Bayern)	Luitpolding (Bavarian)	919	—	921	Rival king to Henry I

=== Holy Roman Empire, 962–1806 ===
The title "King of the Romans", used under the Holy Roman Empire, is (from this point onwards) considered equivalent to King of Germany. A king was chosen by the German electors and would then proceed to Rome to be crowned emperor by the pope.

==== Ottonian dynasty (continued) ====
Image	Name	House	King	Emperor	Ended	Notes
	Otto I the Great (Otto I. der Große)	Ottonian	7 August 936	2 February 962	7 May 973	Son of Henry I; first king crowned in Aachen Cathedral since Lothair I; crowned as Otto by the grace of God King; crowned Holy Roman Emperor in 961
	Otto II the Red (Otto II.)	Ottonian	26 May 961	25 December 967	7 December 983	Son of Otto I; Otto by the grace of God King under his father 961–973; also crowned Emperor in his father's lifetime
	Otto III (Otto III.)	Ottonian	25 December 983	21 May 996	21 January 1002	Son of Otto II; Otto by the grace of God King
	Henry II (Heinrich II. der Heilige)	Ottonian	7 June 1002	26 April 1014	13 July 1024	Great-grandson of Henry I

==== Salian dynasty ====
Image	Name	House	King	Emperor	Ended	Notes
	Conrad II (Konrad II.)	Salian (Frankish)	8 September 1024	26 March 1027	4 June 1039	Great-great-grandson of Otto I
	Henry III (Heinrich III.)	Salian	14 April 1028	25 December 1046	5 October 1056	Son of Conrad II; King (of the Germans?) under his father 1028–1039
	Henry IV (Heinrich IV.)	Salian	17 July 1054	21 March 1084	31 December 1105	Son of Henry III; King of Germany under his father, 1054–1056
	Rudolf of Rheinfelden (Rudolf von Rheinfelden)	Rheinfeld	15 March 1077	—	15 October 1080	Rival king to Henry IV
	Hermann of Salm (Hermann von Luxemburg, Graf von Salm)	Salm	6 August 1081	—	28 September 1088	Rival king to Henry IV
	Conrad (Konrad)	Salian	30 May 1087	—	27 July 1101	Son of Henry IV; King of Germany under his father, 1087–1098, King of Italy, 1093–1098, 1095–1101 in rebellion.
	Henry V (Heinrich V.)	Salian	6 January 1099	13 April 1111	23 May 1125	Son of Henry IV; King of Germany under his father, 1099–1105, forced his father to abdicate

==== Supplinburger dynasty ====
Image	Name	House	King	Emperor	Ended	Notes
	Lothair III (Lothar III.)	Supplinburger	30 August 1125	4 June 1133	4 December 1137	He was Lothair II of Germany, but Lothair III of Italy

==== Hohenstaufen and Welf dynasties ====
Image	Name	House	King	Emperor	Ended	Notes
	Conrad III (Konrad III.)	Hohenstaufen	7 March 1138	—	15 February 1152	Grandson of Henry IV (through his mother); Previously Rival King to Lothair III 1127–1135
	Henry Berengar (Heinrich (VI.))	Hohenstaufen	30 March 1147	—	August? 1150	Son of Conrad III; King of Germany under his father 1147–1150
	Frederick I Barbarossa (Friedrich I. Barbarossa)	Hohenstaufen	4 March 1152	18 June 1155	10 June 1190	Nephew of Conrad III
	Henry VI (Heinrich VI.)	Hohenstaufen	15 August 1169	14 April 1191	28 September 1197	Son of Frederick I; King of Germany under his father 1169–1190
	Frederick II (Friedrich II.)	Hohenstaufen	1197	—	1197	Son of Henry VI; King of Germany under his father, 1196
	Philip of Swabia (Philipp von Schwaben)	Hohenstaufen	6 March 1198	—	21 August 1208	Son of Frederick I; rival king to Otto IV
	Otto IV (Otto IV. von Braunschweig)	Welf	29 March 1198	4 October 1209	5 July 1215	Rival king to Philip of Swabia; later opposed by Frederick II; deposed, 1215; died 19 May 1218
	Frederick II (Friedrich II.)	Hohenstaufen	5 December 1212	22 November 1220	26 December 1250	Son of Henry VI; Rival king to Otto IV until 5 July 1215
	Henry (Heinrich (VII.))	Hohenstaufen	23 April 1220	—	15 August 1235	Son of Frederick II; King of Germany under his father, 1220–1235
	Conrad IV (Konrad IV.)	Hohenstaufen	May 1237	—	1 May 1254	Son of Frederick II; King of Germany under his father, 1237–1250

==== Interregnum ====
Image	Coat of arms	Name	House	King	Emperor	Ended	Notes
		Henry Raspe (Heinrich Raspe)	Thuringia	22 May 1246	—	16 February 1247	Rival King to Frederick II and great-great-great grandson of Henry IV
		William of Holland (Wilhelm von Holland)	Holland	3 October 1247	—	28 January 1256	Rival King to Frederick II and Conrad IV, 1247–1254
		Richard of Cornwall (Richard von Cornwall)	Plantagenet	13 January 1257	—	2 April 1272	Brother-in-law of Frederick II; rival king to Alfonso of Castile; held no real authority.
		Alfonso of Castile (Alfons von Kastilien)	House of Ivrea	1 April 1257	—	1275	Grandson of Philip; rival king to Richard of Cornwall; held no authority; later opposed by Rudolf I; relinquished claims 1275, died 1284

==== Changing dynasties ====
Image	Coat of arms	Name	House	King	Emperor	Ended	Notes
		Rudolf I (Rudolf I. von Habsburg)	Habsburg	29 September 1273	—	15 July 1291	First of the Habsburgs
		Adolf of Nassau (Adolf von Nassau)	Nassau	5 May 1292	—	23 June 1298	According to some historians, Adolf's election was preceded by the short-lived kingship of Conrad, Duke of Teck. See his article for details.
		Albert I (Albrecht I. von Habsburg)	Habsburg	24 June 1298	—	1 May 1308	Son of Rudolf I; Rival king to Adolf of Nassau, 1298
		Henry VII (Heinrich VII. von Luxemburg)	Luxembourg	27 November 1308	13 June 1311	24 August 1313	Holy Roman Emperor
		Louis IV (Ludwig IV. der Bayer)	Wittelsbach	20 October 1314	17 January 1328	11 October 1347	Grandson of Rudolf I; rival king to Frederick the Fair, 1314–1322
		Frederick the Fair (Friedrich der Schöne)	Habsburg	19 October 1314/ 5 September 1325	—	28 September 1322/ 13 January 1330	Son of Albert I; rival king to Louis IV, 1314–1322; associate king with Louis IV, 1325–1330
		Charles IV (Karl IV. von Luxemburg)	Luxembourg	11 July 1346	5 April 1355	29 November 1378	Grandson of Henry VII; rival king to Louis IV, 1346–1347; also King of Bohemia, King of Italy and Holy Roman Emperor
		Günther von Schwarzburg (Günther von Schwarzburg)	Schwarzburg	30 January 1349	—	24 May 1349	Rival king to Charles IV
		Wenceslaus (Wenzel von Böhmen)	Luxembourg	10 June 1376	—	20 August 1400	Son of Charles IV; king of Germany under his father 1376–1378; deposed 1400; also by inheritance King of Bohemia; died 1419
		Rupert of the Palatinate (Ruprecht von der Pfalz)	Wittelsbach	21 August 1400	—	18 May 1410	Great-grandnephew of Louis IV
		Sigismund (Sigismund von Luxemburg)	Luxembourg	20 September 1410 /21 July 1411	3 May 1433	9 December 1437	Son of Charles IV
		Jobst of Moravia (Jobst von Mähren)	Luxembourg	1 October 1410	—	8 January 1411	Nephew of Charles IV; rival king to Sigismund

==== Habsburg ====
Image	Coat of arms	Name	House	King	Emperor	Ended	Notes
		Albert II (Albrecht II.)	Habsburg	18 March 1438	—	27 October 1439	4th in descent from Albert I; son-in-law of Sigismund
		Frederick III (Friedrich III.)	Habsburg	2 February 1440	16 March 1452	19 August 1493	4th in descent from Albert I; 2nd cousin of Albert II
		Maximilian I (Maximilian I.)	Habsburg	16 February 1486	4 February 1508	12 January 1519	Son of Frederick III; King of Germany under his father, 1486–1493; assumed the title "Elected Emperor" in 1508 with the pope's approval
		Charles V (Karl V.)	Habsburg	28 June 1519	28 June 1519	3 August 1556	Grandson of Maximilian I; died 21 September 1558
		Ferdinand I (Ferdinand I.)	Habsburg	5 January 1531	14 March 1558	25 July 1564	Grandson of Maximilian I; brother of Charles V; King of Germany under his brother Charles V 1531–1556; last king to be crowned in Aachen Cathedral. Emperor
		Maximilian II (Maximilian II.)	Habsburg	22 November 1562	25 July 1564	12 October 1576	Son of Ferdinand I; King of Germany under his father 1562–1564
		Rudolf II (Rudolf II.)	Habsburg	27 October 1575	2 November 1576	20 January 1612	Son of Maximilian II; King of Germany under his father, 1575–1576
		Matthias (Matthias)	Habsburg	13 June 1612	13 June 1612	20 March 1619	Son of Maximilian II
		Ferdinand II (Ferdinand II.)	Habsburg	28 August 1619	28 August 1619	15 February 1637	Grandson of Ferdinand I
		Ferdinand III (Ferdinand III.)	Habsburg	22 December 1636	15 February 1637	2 April 1657	Son of Ferdinand II; King of Germany under his father 1636–1637
		Ferdinand IV (Ferdinand IV.)	Habsburg	31 May 1653	—	9 July 1654	Son of Ferdinand III; King of Germany under his father
		Leopold I (Leopold I.)	Habsburg	18 July 1658	18 July 1658	5 May 1705	Son of Ferdinand III
		Joseph I (Joseph I.)	Habsburg	23 January 1690	5 May 1705	17 April 1711	Son of Leopold I; King of Germany under his father 1690–1705
		Charles VI (Karl VI.)	Habsburg	27 October 1711	27 October 1711	20 October 1740	Son of Leopold I

==== Wittelsbach ====
Image	Coat of arms	Name	House	King	Emperor	Ended	Notes
		Charles VII (Karl VII.)	Wittelsbach	14 January 1742	14 January 1742	20 January 1745	Great-great-grandson of Ferdinand II; Husband of Maria Amalia, daughter of Joseph I

==== Habsburg-Lorraine ====
Image	Coat of arms	Name	House	King	Emperor	Ended	Notes
		Francis I (Franz I.)	Lorraine	13 September 1745	13 September 1745	18 August 1765	Great-grandson of Ferdinand III; Husband of Maria Theresa, daughter of Charles VI
		Joseph II (Joseph II.)	Habsburg-Lorraine	27 March 1764	18 August 1765	20 February 1790	Son of Francis I and Maria Theresa; King of Germany under his father 1764–1765
		Leopold II (Leopold II.)	Habsburg-Lorraine	30 September 1790	30 September 1790	1 March 1792	Son of Francis I and Maria Theresa
		Francis II (Franz II.)	Habsburg-Lorraine	7 July 1792	7 July 1792	6 August 1806	Son of Leopold II; Dissolved the Holy Roman Empire; also Emperor of Austria 1804–1835; President of the German Confederation (1815-1835), died 1835

=== Confederation of the Rhine, 1806–1813 ===
Name	Portrait	Title	House	Began	Ended
Napoleon; Emperor of the French; King of Italy		Protector of the Confederation of the Rhine	Bonaparte	12 July 1806	December 1813
Karl Theodor von Dalberg, Prince-Archbishop of Regensburg; Grand Duke of Frankfurt		Prince-primate of the Confederation of the Rhine	Dalberg	25 July 1806	26 October 1813
Eugène de Beauharnais, Grand Duke of Frankfurt		Prince-primate of the Confederation of the Rhine	Beauharnais	26 October 1813	December; 1813

=== German Confederation, 1815–1866 ===
Name	Portrait	Title	House	Began	Ended
Francis I, Emperor of Austria (Franz I., Kaiser von Österreich)		Head of the presiding power (Präsidialmacht) Austria	Habsburg-Lorraine	20 June 1815	2 March 1835
Ferdinand I, Emperor of Austria (Ferdinand I., Kaiser von Österreich)		Head of the presiding power (Präsidialmacht) Austria	Habsburg-Lorraine	2 March 1835	12 July 1848
Archduke John of Austria (Erzherzog Johann von Österreich)		Regent (Reichsverweser) of the revolutionary German Empire	Habsburg-Lorraine	12 July 1848	20 December 1849
Frederick William IV, King of Prussia (Friedrich Wilhelm IV., König von Preußen)		Emperor of the Germans elect	Hohenzollern	28 March 1849	28 April 1849
Frederick William IV, King of Prussia (Friedrich Wilhelm IV., König von Preußen)		Presidium of the Union (Unionsvorstand) of the Erfurt Union	Hohenzollern	26 May 1849	29 November 1850
Francis Joseph I, Emperor of Austria (Franz Joseph I., Kaiser von Österreich)		Head of the presiding power (Präsidialmacht) Austria	Habsburg-Lorraine	1 May 1850	24 August 1866

=== North German Confederation, 1867–1871 ===
Name	Portrait	Title	House	Began	Ended
Wilhelm I, King of Prussia (Wilhelm I, König von Preußen)		Holder of the Bundespräsidium of the North German Confederation	Hohenzollern	1 July 1867	1 January 1871

=== German Reich, 1871–1945 ===
==== German Emperor, 1871-1918 ====
Name	Portrait	Title	House	Began	Ended
Wilhelm I, German Emperor (Wilhelm I., Deutscher Kaiser)		German Emperor	Hohenzollern	1 January 1871	9 March 1888
Friedrich III, German Emperor (Friedrich III., Deutscher Kaiser)		German Emperor	Hohenzollern	9 March 1888	15 June 1888
Wilhelm II, German Emperor (Wilhelm II., Deutscher Kaiser)		German Emperor	Hohenzollern	15 June 1888	9/28 November 1918

==== President, 1919–1945 ====
† denotes people who died in office.

Portrait	Reichspräsident	Took office	Left office	Time in office	Party	Election
Friedrich Ebert	Friedrich Ebert (1871–1925)	11 February 1919	28 February 1925 †	6 years, 17 days	SPD	1919
Hans Luther	Hans Luther (1879–1962); Acting (Note: Acting head of state, as Chancellor of Germany)	28 February 1925	12 March 1925	12 days	Nonpartisan	–
Walter Simons	Walter Simons (1861–1937); Acting (Note: Acting head of state, as President of the Reichsgericht.)	12 March 1925	12 May 1925	61 days	Nonpartisan	–
Paul von Hindenburg	Generalfeldmarschall; Paul von Hindenburg (1847–1934)	12 May 1925	2 August 1934 †	9 years, 82 days	Nonpartisan	1925; 1932
Adolf Hitler	Adolf Hitler (1889–1945); Führer und Reichskanzler	2 August 1934	30 April 1945 †	10 years, 271 days	NSDAP	–
Karl Dönitz	Großadmiral; Karl Dönitz (1891–1980)	30 April 1945	23 May 1945	23 days	NSDAP	–

=== Federal Republic of Germany, from 1949 ===
† denotes people who died in office.

Portrait	Bundespräsident	Took office	Left office	Time in office	Party	Election
Theodor Heuss	Theodor Heuss (1884–1963)	13 September 1949	12 September 1959	9 years, 364 days	FDP	1949; 1954
Heinrich Lübke	Heinrich Lübke (1894–1972)	13 September 1959	30 June 1969 (resigned)	9 years, 290 days	CDU	1959; 1964
Gustav Heinemann	Gustav Heinemann (1899–1976)	1 July 1969	30 June 1974	4 years, 364 days	SPD	1969
Walter Scheel	Walter Scheel (1919–2016)	1 July 1974	30 June 1979	4 years, 364 days	FDP	1974
Karl Carstens	Karl Carstens (1914–1992)	1 July 1979	30 June 1984	4 years, 365 days	CDU	1979
Richard von Weizsäcker	Richard von Weizsäcker (1920–2015)	1 July 1984	30 June 1994	9 years, 364 days	CDU	1984; 1989
Roman Herzog	Roman Herzog (1934–2017)	1 July 1994	30 June 1999	4 years, 364 days	CDU	1994
Johannes Rau	Johannes Rau (1931–2006)	1 July 1999	30 June 2004	4 years, 365 days	SPD	1999
Horst Köhler	Horst Köhler (1943–2025)	1 July 2004	31 May 2010 (resigned)	5 years, 334 days	CDU	2004; 2009
Jens Böhrnsen	Jens Böhrnsen (born 1949); Acting (Note: Acting head of state, as President of the Bundesrat.)	31 May 2010	30 June 2010	30 days	SPD	–
Christian Wulff	Christian Wulff (born 1959)	30 June 2010	17 February 2012 (resigned)	1 year, 232 days	CDU	2010
Horst Seehofer	Horst Seehofer (born 1949); Acting	17 February 2012	18 March 2012	30 days	CSU	–
Joachim Gauck	Joachim Gauck (born 1940)	18 March 2012	18 March 2017	5 years, 0 days	Independent	2012
Frank-Walter Steinmeier	Frank-Walter Steinmeier (born 1956)	18 March 2017	Incumbent	9 years, 170 days	SPD	2017; 2022

=== German Democratic Republic (East Germany), 1949–1990 ===
† denotes people who died in office.

Portrait	Name	Took office	Left office	Time in office	Party
President of the Republic Präsident der Republik
Johannes Dieckmann	Johannes Dieckmann (1893–1969); Acting (Note: Acting head of state, as President of the Volkskammer.)	7 October 1949	11 October 1949	4 days	LDPD
Wilhelm Pieck	Wilhelm Pieck (1876–1960)	11 October 1949	7 September 1960 †	10 years, 332 days	SED
Johannes Dieckmann	Johannes Dieckmann (1893–1969); Acting	7 September 1960	12 September 1960	5 days	LDPD
Chairman of the State Council Vorsitzender des Staatsrats
Walter Ulbricht	Walter Ulbricht (1893–1973)	12 September 1960	1 August 1973 †	12 years, 323 days	SED
Friedrich Ebert Jr.	Friedrich Ebert Jr. (1894–1979); Acting (Note: Acting head of state, as Deputy Chairman of the State Council.)	1 August 1973	3 October 1973	63 days	SED
Willi Stoph	Willi Stoph (1914–1999)	3 October 1973	29 October 1976	3 years, 26 days	SED
Erich Honecker	Erich Honecker (1912–1994)	29 October 1976	18 October 1989 (resigned)	12 years, 354 days	SED
Egon Krenz	Egon Krenz (born 1937)	18 October 1989	6 December 1989 (resigned)	49 days	SED
Manfred Gerlach	Manfred Gerlach (1928–2011)	6 December 1989	5 April 1990 (office abolished)	120 days	LDPD
President of the People's Chamber Präsident der Volkskammer
Sabine Bergmann-Pohl	Sabine Bergmann-Pohl (born 1946)	5 April 1990	2 October 1990 (East Germany joined Federal Republic)	180 days	CDU

== Styles ==
Unified state (1871 to 1945)

Country	Years	Title
German Empire	1871–1918	German Emperor (Deutscher Kaiser)
Weimar Republic	1919–1933	President of the Reich (Reichspräsident)
Nazi Germany	1933–1934	President of the Reich (Reichspräsident)
Nazi Germany	1934–1945	Leader and Chancellor (Führer und Reichskanzler)
Nazi Germany	1945	President of the Reich (Reichspräsident)

East and West Germany (1949 to 1990)

Country	Years	Title
West Germany	1949–1990	Federal President (Bundespräsident)
East Germany	1949–1960	President of the German Democratic Republic (Präsident der Deutschen Demokratischen Republik)
East Germany	1960–1990	Chairman of the State Council (Vorsitzender des Staatsrates)
East Germany	1990	President of the People's Chamber (Präsident der Volkskammer)

Unified state (1990 to present)

Country	Years	Title
Germany	1990–present	Federal President (Bundespräsident)
