= List of presidents of Germany =

A number of presidential offices have existed in Germany since the collapse of the German Empire in 1918.

The Weimar Constitution of August 1919 created the office of President of the Reich (German: Reichspräsident). Upon the death of Paul von Hindenburg in August 1934, the office was left vacant, with Adolf Hitler becoming head of state as Führer und Reichskanzler, in accordance with the Law Concerning the Head of State of the German Reich (retroactively approved by a referendum). In April–May 1945, Karl Dönitz briefly became President upon the suicide of Hitler (in accordance with Hitler's last will and testament).

The Basic Law for the Federal Republic of Germany of May 1949 created the office of Federal President of the Federal Republic of Germany (German: Bundespräsident der Bundesrepublik Deutschland). Since German reunification in 1990, the President has been the head of state for all of Germany.

The East German constitution of October 1949 created the office of President of the German Democratic Republic (German: Präsident der Deutschen Demokratischen Republik). Upon the death of Wilhelm Pieck in 1960, the office of president was replaced by a collective head of state, the Staatsrat ("State Council"). After the Staatsrat was abolished on 5 April 1990, the president of the Volkskammer ("People's Chamber") served as head of state until East Germany joined the Federal Republic on 3 October 1990

== Weimar Republic (1919–1933) ==
† denotes people who died in office.

Portrait	Reichspräsident	Took office	Left office	Time in office	Party	Election
Friedrich Ebert	Friedrich Ebert (1871–1925)	11 February 1919	28 February 1925 †	6 years, 17 days	SPD	1919
Hans Luther	Hans Luther (1879–1962); Acting (Note: Acting President, as Chancellor of Germany.)	28 February 1925	12 March 1925	12 days	Independent	–
Walter Simons	Walter Simons (1861–1937); Acting (Note: Acting President, as President of the Reichsgericht.)	12 March 1925	12 May 1925	61 days	Independent	–
Paul von Hindenburg	Generalfeldmarschall; Paul von Hindenburg (1847–1934)	12 May 1925	23 March 1933	7 years, 315 days	Independent	1925; 1932

== Nazi Germany (1933–1945) ==
† denotes people who died in office.

Portrait	Reichspräsident	Took office	Left office	Time in office	Party
Paul von Hindenburg	Generalfeldmarschall; Paul von Hindenburg (1847–1934)	23 March 1933	2 August 1934 †	1 year, 132 days	Independent
Adolf Hitler	Adolf Hitler (1889–1945); Führer und Reichskanzler	2 August 1934	30 April 1945 †	10 years, 271 days	NSDAP
Karl Dönitz	Großadmiral; Karl Dönitz (1891–1980)	30 April 1945	23 May 1945	23 days	NSDAP

== German Democratic Republic (East Germany) (1949–1990) ==
† denotes people who died in office.

Portrait	Name	Took office	Left office	Time in office	Party
President of the Republic Präsident der Republik
Johannes Dieckmann	Johannes Dieckmann (1893–1969); Acting (Note: Acting head of state, as President of the Volkskammer.)	7 October 1949	11 October 1949	4 days	LDPD
Wilhelm Pieck	Wilhelm Pieck (1876–1960)	11 October 1949	7 September 1960 †	10 years, 332 days	SED
Johannes Dieckmann	Johannes Dieckmann (1893–1969); Acting	7 September 1960	12 September 1960	5 days	LDPD
Chairman of the State Council Vorsitzender des Staatsrats
Walter Ulbricht	Walter Ulbricht (1893–1973)	12 September 1960	1 August 1973 †	12 years, 323 days	SED
Friedrich Ebert Jr.	Friedrich Ebert Jr. (1894–1979); Acting (Note: Acting Chairman of the State Council, as Deputy Chairman of the State Council.)	1 August 1973	3 October 1973	63 days	SED
Willi Stoph	Willi Stoph (1914–1999)	3 October 1973	29 October 1976	3 years, 26 days	SED
Erich Honecker	Erich Honecker (1912–1994)	29 October 1976	18 October 1989 (resigned)	12 years, 354 days	SED
Egon Krenz	Egon Krenz (born 1937)	18 October 1989	6 December 1989 (resigned)	49 days	SED
Manfred Gerlach	Manfred Gerlach (1928–2011)	6 December 1989	5 April 1990 (office abolished)	120 days	LDPD
President of the People's Chamber Präsident der Volkskammer
Sabine Bergmann-Pohl	Sabine Bergmann-Pohl (born 1946)	5 April 1990	2 October 1990 (office abolished)	180 days	CDU

== Federal Republic of Germany (1949–present) ==
† denotes people who died in office.

Portrait	Bundespräsident	Took office	Left office	Time in office	Party	Election
Karl Arnold	Karl Arnold (1901–1958); Acting (Note: Acting President, as President of the Bundesrat.)	7 September 1949	12 September 1949	5 days	CDU	–
Theodor Heuss	Theodor Heuss (1884–1963)	12 September 1949	12 September 1959	10 years	FDP	1949; 1954
Heinrich Lübke	Heinrich Lübke (1894–1972)	13 September 1959	30 June 1969 (resigned)	9 years, 290 days	CDU	1959; 1964
Gustav Heinemann	Gustav Heinemann (1899–1976)	1 July 1969	30 June 1974	4 years, 364 days	SPD	1969
Walter Scheel	Walter Scheel (1919–2016)	1 July 1974	30 June 1979	4 years, 364 days	FDP	1974
Karl Carstens	Karl Carstens (1914–1992)	1 July 1979	30 June 1984	4 years, 365 days	CDU	1979
Richard von Weizsäcker	Richard von Weizsäcker (1920–2015)	1 July 1984	30 June 1994	9 years, 364 days	CDU	1984; 1989
Roman Herzog	Roman Herzog (1934–2017)	1 July 1994	30 June 1999	4 years, 364 days	CDU	1994
Johannes Rau	Johannes Rau (1931–2006)	1 July 1999	30 June 2004	4 years, 365 days	SPD	1999
Horst Köhler	Horst Köhler (1943–2025)	1 July 2004	31 May 2010 (resigned)	5 years, 334 days	CDU	2004; 2009
Jens Böhrnsen	Jens Böhrnsen (born 1949); Acting	31 May 2010	30 June 2010	30 days	SPD	–
Christian Wulff	Christian Wulff (born 1959)	30 June 2010	17 February 2012 (resigned)	1 year, 232 days	CDU	2010
Horst Seehofer	Horst Seehofer (born 1949); Acting	17 February 2012	18 March 2012	30 days	CSU	–
Joachim Gauck	Joachim Gauck (born 1940)	18 March 2012	18 March 2017	5 years	Independent	2012
Frank-Walter Steinmeier	Frank-Walter Steinmeier (born 1956)	19 March 2017	Incumbent	9 years, 206 days	SPD	2017; 2022

== See also ==
- German Emperor
  - List of monarchs of Germany
- President of Germany
- President of Germany (1919–1945)
- Leadership of East Germany
- President of East Germany
- Chancellor of Germany
  - List of chancellors of Germany
