= President of Germany =

Head of state

Federal President of the Federal Republic of Germany
- Bundespräsident der Bundesrepublik Deutschland
- Logo of the German President

- Standard of the German President

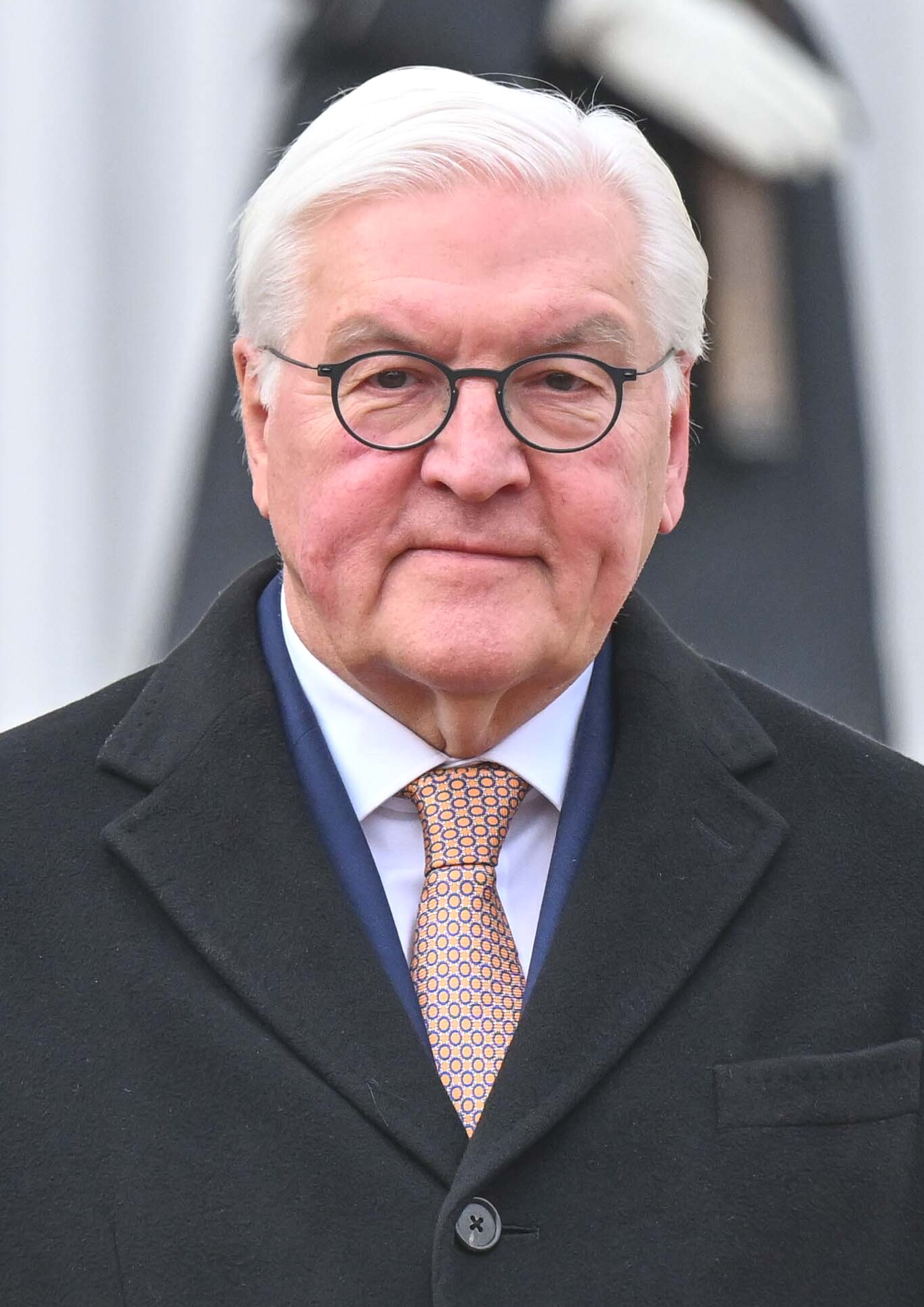
- Incumbent; Frank-Walter Steinmeier since 19 March 2017
- Style: Mr. President (informal); Herr Bundespräsident (informal); His Excellency (diplomatic)
- Status: Head of state
- Residence: Schloss Bellevue (Berlin); Villa Hammerschmidt (Bonn)
- Appointer: Federal Convention
- Term length: 5 years, renewable once consecutively
- Constituting instrument: Basic Law for the Federal Republic of Germany (1949)
- Precursor: The Reichspräsident
- Inaugural holder: Friedrich Ebert (Weimar Republic); Theodor Heuss (Federal Republic of Germany)
- Formation: 11 February 1919 (Weimar Republic); 23 May 1949 (Federal Republic of Germany)
- Deputy: President of the German Bundesrat (Ex officio)
- Salary: €276,000 annually
- Website: bundespraesident.de

The president of Germany, officially titled the federal president of the Federal Republic of Germany (German: Bundespräsident der Bundesrepublik Deutschland), is the head of state of Germany. The current officeholder is Frank-Walter Steinmeier, who was elected on 12 February 2017 and re-elected on 13 February 2022. He is currently serving his second five-year-term, which began on 19 March 2022.

Under the 1949 constitution (Basic Law) Germany has a parliamentary system of government in which the chancellor is the head of government (the title prime minister is most common for this role in other countries). The president has a ceremonial role as figurehead, but also has the right and duty to act politically. They can give direction to general political and societal debates and have some important reserve powers in case of political instability (such as those provided for by Article 81 of the Basic Law). The president also holds the prerogative to grant pardons on behalf of the federation. The German presidents, who can be elected to two consecutive five-year terms, have wide discretion about how they exercise their official duties.

Under Article 59(1) of the Basic Law, the president represents the Federal Republic of Germany in matters of international law, concludes treaties with foreign states on its behalf and accredits diplomats. Furthermore, all federal laws must be signed by the president before they can come into effect; presidents may veto a law if they believe it to violate the constitution.

The president's actions and public appearances represent the state itself, its existence, legitimacy, and unity. The president enjoys a higher ranking at official functions than the chancellor. The president's role is integrative and includes the control function of upholding the law and the constitution. It is a matter of political tradition – not legal restrictions – that the president generally does not comment routinely on issues in the news, particularly when there is some controversy among the political parties. This distance from day-to-day politics and daily governmental issues allows the president to be a source of clarification, to influence public debate, voice criticism, offer suggestions, and make proposals. In order to exercise this power, they traditionally act above party politics.

== Election ==
The president is elected by the Federal Convention, a non-permanent constitutional body, which has no other function. The Federal Convention consists of all members of the Bundestag (the federal parliament) and an exactly equal number of state electors, which are distributed to the sixteen states in proportion to their population. The state electors are elected by the state parliaments in a manner proportionate to their compositions. The president is elected to a term of five years. There is no limit on the number of terms a president may serve, though re-election to a consecutive term is only permitted once.

The Basic Law requires that the convention be convened no later than 30 days before the scheduled expiry of the sitting president's term or 30 days after a premature expiry of a president's term (by resignation, death or impeachment). The body is convened and chaired by the president of the Bundestag. From 1979 to 2009, all these conventions were held on 23 May, the anniversary of the foundation of the Federal Republic in 1949. The resignation of Horst Köhler in 2010, which necessitated an early meeting of the Federal Convention, brought this tradition to an end.

The Federal Convention votes by secret ballot and without debate. In the first two rounds of the election, the candidate who achieves an absolute majority of all members of the Federal Convention is elected. If, after two rounds of voting, no single candidate has received this level of support, a third and final round is held where a plurality of votes cast is sufficient.

The result of the election is often determined by party politics. In most cases, the candidate of the majority party or coalition in the Bundestag is considered to be the likely winner. However, as the members of the Federal Convention vote by secret ballot and are free to vote against their party's candidate, some presidential elections were considered open or too-close-to-call beforehand because of relatively balanced majority positions. There have also been cases, when the governing coalition's parties could not agree on one candidate and endorsed different people, as they did in 1969, when Gustav Heinemann won by only six votes on the third ballot. In other cases, elections have turned out to be much closer than expected. For example, in 2010, Christian Wulff was expected to win on the first ballot, as the parties supporting him (CDU, CSU and FDP) had a stable absolute majority in the Federal Convention. Nevertheless, he failed to win a majority in the first and second ballots, while his main opponent Joachim Gauck had an unexpectedly strong showing. In the end, Wulff obtained a majority in the third ballot. If the opposition has turned in a strong showing in recent state elections, it can potentially have enough support to even defeat the candidate of the governing coalition; this happened in the elections in 1979 and 2004.

=== List of elections ===
Election	Date	Site	Ballots	Winner (endorsing parties) (Note: governing parties in bold)	Electoral votes (percentage)	Runner-up (endorsing parties) (Note: governing parties in bold)	Electoral votes (percentage)
1st Federal Convention	12 September 1949	Bonn	2	Theodor Heuss (**FDP**, **CDU**, **CSU)**	416 (51.7%)	Kurt Schumacher (SPD)	312 (38.8%)
2nd Federal Convention	17 July 1954	West Berlin	1	Theodor Heuss (**FDP**, **CDU**, **CSU**, SPD)	871 (85.6%)	Alfred Weber (KPD)	12 (1.2%)
3rd Federal Convention	1 July 1959	West Berlin	2	Heinrich Lübke (**CDU**, **CSU**)	526 (50.7%)	Carlo Schmid (SPD)	386 (37.2%)
4th Federal Convention	1 July 1964	West Berlin	1	Heinrich Lübke (**CDU**, **CSU**, SPD)	710 (68.1%)	Ewald Bucher (**FDP**)	123 (11.8%)
5th Federal Convention	5 March 1969	West Berlin	3	Gustav Heinemann (**SPD**, FDP)	512 (49.4%)	Gerhard Schröder (**CDU**, **CSU**, NPD)	506 (48.8%)
6th Federal Convention	15 May 1974	Bonn	1	Walter Scheel (**FDP**, **SPD**)	530 (51.2%)	Richard von Weizsäcker (CDU, CSU)	498 (48.1%)
7th Federal Convention	23 May 1979	Bonn	1	Karl Carstens (CDU, CSU)	528 (51%)	Annemarie Renger (**SPD**)	431 (41.6%)
8th Federal Convention	23 May 1984	Bonn	1	Richard von Weizsäcker (**CDU**, **CSU**, **FDP**, SPD)	832 (80%)	Luise Rinser (Greens)	68 (6.5%)
9th Federal Convention	23 May 1989	Bonn	1	Richard von Weizsäcker (**CDU**, **CSU**, **FDP**, SPD)	881 (84.9%)	None	108 (10.4%) no-votes
10th Federal Convention	23 May 1994	Berlin	3	Roman Herzog (**CDU**, **CSU**)	696 (52.6%)	Johannes Rau (SPD)	605 (45.7%)
11th Federal Convention	23 May 1999	Berlin	2	Johannes Rau (**SPD**, **Greens**)	690 (51.6%)	Dagmar Schipanski (CDU, CSU)	572 (42.8%)
12th Federal Convention	23 May 2004	Berlin	1	Horst Köhler (CDU, CSU, FDP)	604 (50.1%)	Gesine Schwan (**SPD**, **Greens**)	589 (48.9%)
13th Federal Convention	23 May 2009	Berlin	1	Horst Köhler (**CDU**, **CSU**, FDP, FW)	613 (50.1%)	Gesine Schwan (**SPD**, Greens)	503 (41.1%)
14th Federal Convention	30 June 2010	Berlin	3	Christian Wulff (**CDU**, **CSU**, **FDP**)	625 (50.2%)	Joachim Gauck (SPD, Greens)	494 (39.7%)
15th Federal Convention	18 March 2012	Berlin	1	Joachim Gauck (**CDU**, **CSU**, **FDP**, SPD, Greens, Free Voters, SSW)	991 (79.9%)	Beate Klarsfeld (The Left)	126 (10.2%)
16th Federal Convention	12 February 2017	Berlin	1	Frank-Walter Steinmeier (**SPD**, **CDU**, **CSU**, Greens, FDP, SSW)	931 (74.3%)	Christoph Butterwegge (The Left)	128 (10.2%)
17th Federal Convention	13 February 2022	Berlin	1	Frank-Walter Steinmeier (**SPD**, **Greens**, **FDP**, CDU, CSU, SSW)	1045 (72.7%)	Max Otte (AfD)	140 (9.74%)
18th Federal Convention	30 January 2027	Berlin					

=== Qualifications ===
The office of president is open to all Germans who are entitled to vote in Bundestag elections and have reached the age of 40, but no one may serve more than two consecutive five-year terms. The president must not be a member of the government or a legislature at either the federal or state level. During his term of office, he may not hold any paid employment or serve as a member of the supervisory board of a profit-making company.

=== Oath ===
After taking office the president must take the following oath, stipulated by Article 56 of the Basic Law, in a joint session of the Bundestag and the Bundesrat (it is the only event which constitutionally requires a joint session). The religious references may optionally be omitted.

I swear that I will dedicate my efforts to the well-being of the German people, promote their welfare, protect them from harm, uphold and defend the Basic Law and the laws of the Federation, perform my duties conscientiously and do justice to all. (So help me God.)

German constitutional law does not consider oaths of office as constitutive but only as affirmative. This means that the president does not have to take the oath at the very moment of entering office in order to be able to exercise its constitutional powers. In practice, the oath is usually administered during the first days or weeks of a president's term on a date convenient for a joint session of the Bundestag and the Bundesrat. Nevertheless, in theory a persistent refusal to take the oath is considered to be an impeachable offence by legal scholars. If a president is re-elected for a second consecutive term, he does not take the oath again.

== Duties and functions ==
Official residence in the Spreebogen, Berlin (interim seat)

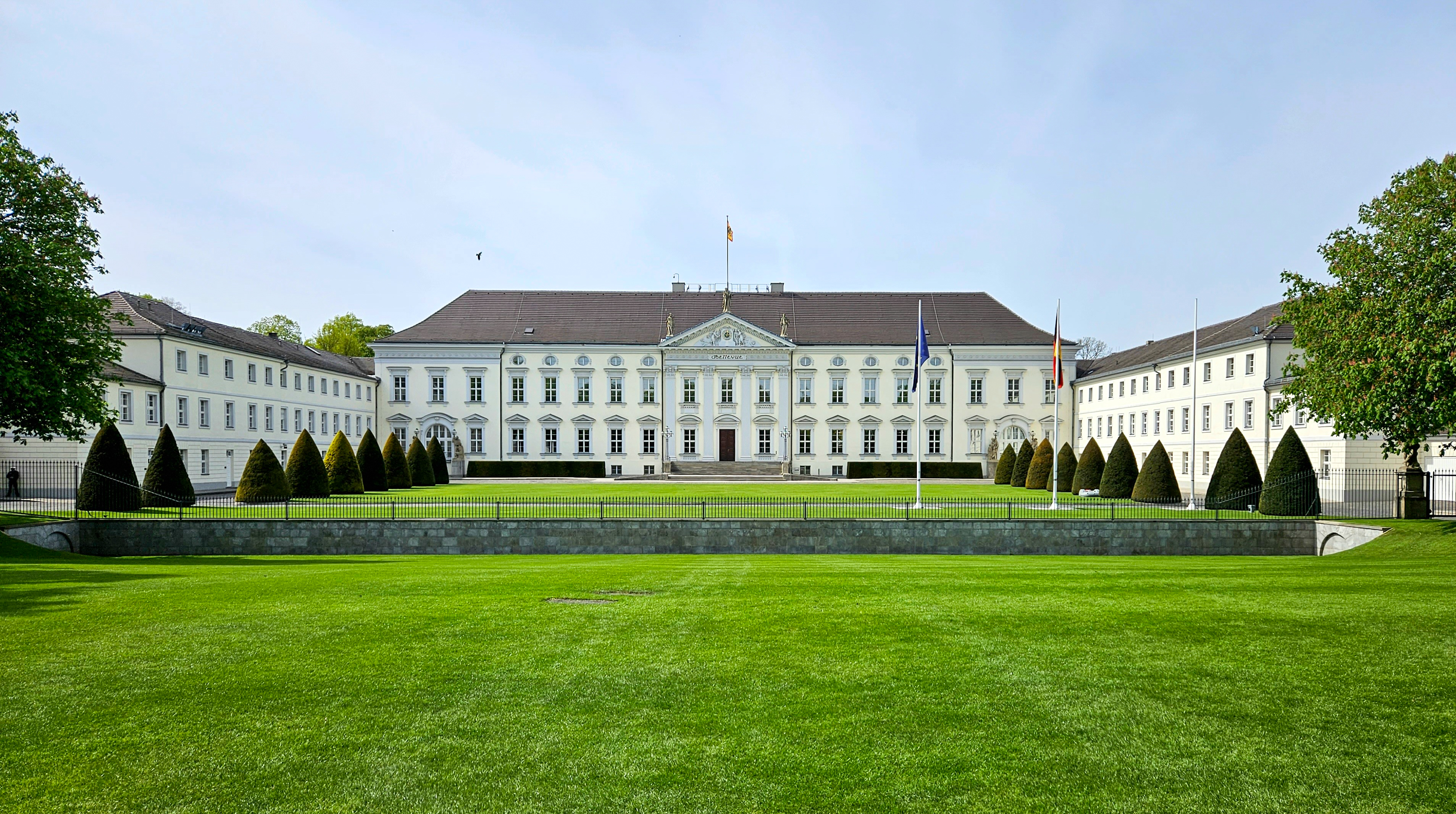
Bellevue Palace, Berlin (primary seat)

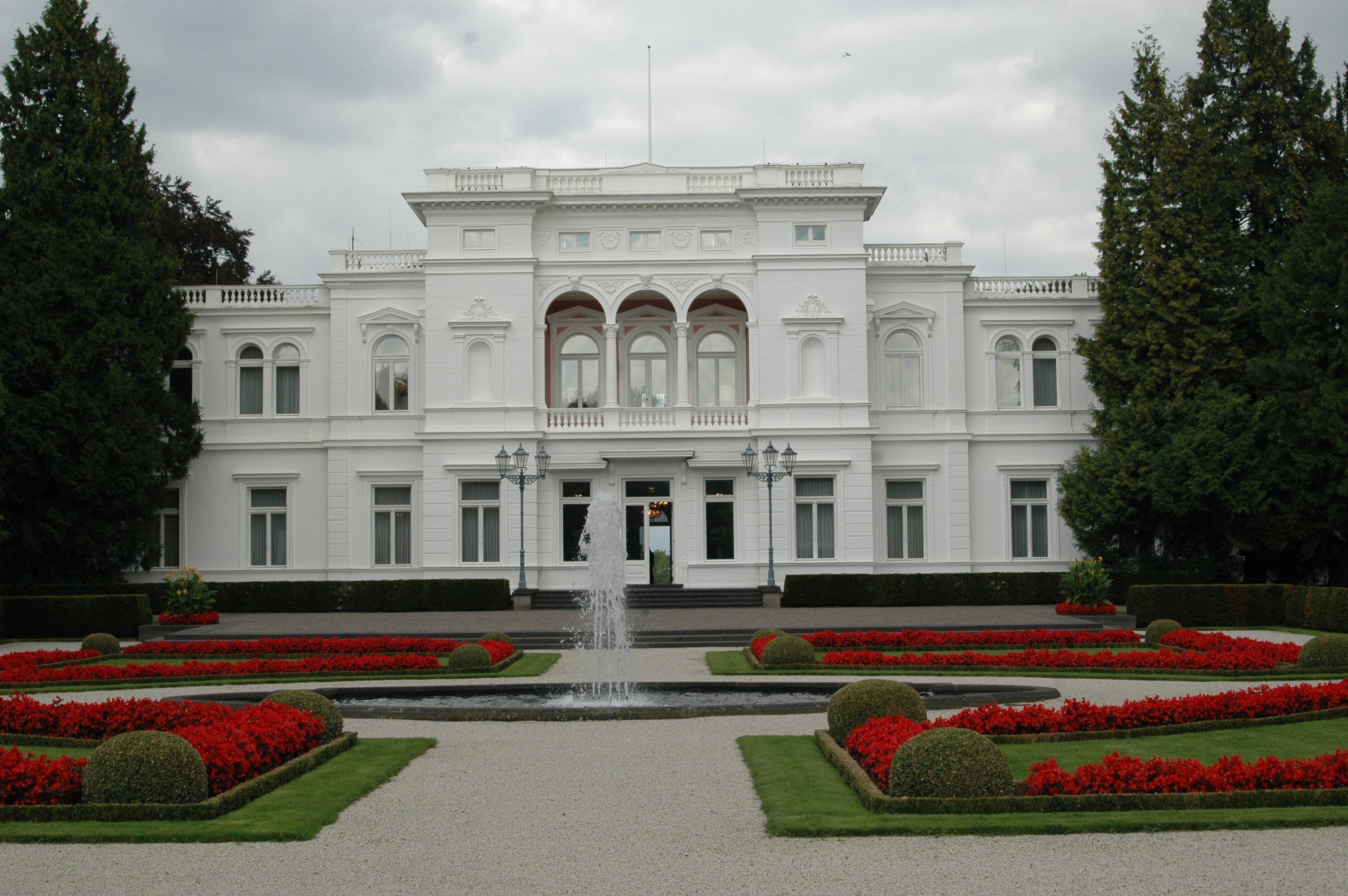
Hammerschmidt Villa, Bonn (secondary seat)

The president is involved in the formation of the Federal Government and remains in close cooperation with it. In principle, the president is free to act on his own discretion. However, according to Article 58 of the Basic Law, the decrees, and directives of the president require the countersignature of the chancellor or the corresponding federal minister in charge of the respective field of politics. This rule ensures the coherence of government action. There is no need for a countersignature if the president proposes, appoints, or dismisses the chancellor; convenes or dissolves the Bundestag according to Article 63; declares a legislative state of emergency; calls on a chancellor and ministers to remain in office after the end of a chancellor's term until a successor is elected; or exercises his right to pardon on behalf of the federation - as these are exclusive powers of the president.

Therefore, the president also receives the chancellor regularly for talks on current policy issues. German presidents also hold talks with individual federal ministers and other senior officials at their own discretion. The "Head of the Office of the President" represents the will and views of the president in the meetings of the Federal Cabinet and reports back to the president.

The president's most prominent powers and duties include:

- Proposing the chancellor to the Bundestag
- Appointing and dismissing the chancellor and their cabinet ministers
- Dissolving the Bundestag under certain circumstances
- Declaring the legislative state of emergency under certain circumstances
- Convening the Bundestag
- Signing and promulgating laws or vetoing them under certain circumstances
- Appointing and dismissing federal judges, federal civil servants, and commissioned and non-commissioned officers of the Armed Forces
- Exercising the power to pardon individual offenders on behalf of the Federation
- Awarding honors on behalf of the Federation
- Representing Germany at home and abroad

=== Appointment of the Federal Government ===
After an election or other vacancy in the chancellor's office, the president must propose an individual to the Bundestag to be elected chancellor. The Bundestag is required to vote on this proposed candidate. If this vote fails, the right of nomination falls to the Bundestag, which is then given 14 days to elect another person. In either case, the president is obliged to appoint the person if a majority of the entire elected Bundestag, not just those present, votes for them (the so-called Kanzlermehrheit, "Chancellor majority").

If the Bundestag cannot elect anyone with a majority in the 14-day period, it is required to hold one final ballot. If a person is elected with a majority on this ballot, the president is once again obliged to appoint them. If there is no majority, the president has seven days to either appoint the person who received a plurality of votes on the final ballot or dissolve the Bundestag.

The chancellor may only be removed if the Bundestag passes a constructive vote of no confidence, indicating that a prospective new chancellor has the support of a majority. The president is then required to dismiss the chancellor and appoint the new candidate.

The president also appoints and dismisses the remaining members of the federal government upon proposal of the chancellor. This theoretically means that the president can appoint only those candidates presented by the chancellor. It is unclear whether the president could refuse to dismiss or appoint a proposed federal minister, as no president has ever done so.

The constitution places no restrictions on who may be chancellor. In practice, the president only proposes a person as chancellor who has previously garnered a majority support in prior coalition talks and traditionally does not interfere in those talks. However, after the "Jamaica coalition" talks failed in the wake of the 2017 election, President Steinmeier invited several Bundestag party leaders to try to bring them together to form a working government.

=== Other appointments ===
The president appoints federal judges, federal civil servants, and military officers.

=== Foreign relations ===
The president represents Germany in the world (Art. 59 Basic Law), undertakes foreign visits, and receives foreign dignitaries. They also conclude treaties with foreign nations (which do not come into effect until affirmed by the Bundestag), accredit German diplomats, and receive the letters of accreditation of foreign diplomats.

=== Pardons and honours ===
According to Article 60(2) of the Basic Law, the president has the pardon power to revoke or commute penal sentences. The president only has the power to act in individual cases; an amnesty waiving or commuting sentences for a whole category of offenses requires a law passed by the Bundestag and Bundesrat. Due to the federal structure of Germany, the president may only intervene in cases that involve crimes under federal law (such as espionage and terrorism) and disciplinary proceedings against federal civil servants, federal judges, and soldiers. The pardon power can also be delegated to other authorities, such as federal ministries.

It is customary that the federal president becomes the honorary godparent of the seventh child in a family if the parents wish it. They also send letters of congratulations to centenarians and long-time married couples.

=== Reserve powers ===
==== Dissolution of the Bundestag ====
Unlike the head of state in Westminster system parliamentary democracies, the president does not have the reserve power to unilaterally dissolve the Bundestag. The Bundestag also does not have the power to dissolve itself. Dissolution by the president can only occur in two scenarios caused by action of the Bundestag:

- The Bundestag fails to elect a chancellor within 14 days of an initial nomination by the president after an election or a vacancy. The Bundestag is then required to hold one final ballot. If the vote still fails to obtain a majority for anyone, the president has seven days to either dissolve the Bundestag, or appoint the person receiving the plurality of votes as chancellor.
- The chancellor proposes a vote of confidence which fails. The chancellor may then advise the president to dissolve the Bundestag, which he may do within the shorter of 21 days or until a constructive vote of no confidence passes to replace the chancellor. The chancellor is not obliged to ask for a dissolution, nor is the president obliged to grant one.

The first scenario has never happened. The second has been used to call snap elections in 1972, 1983, 2005, and 2025, in all four cases with the incumbent chancellor asking his own party to abstain from or vote down the confidence motion and obtaining a dissolution. Though the use of this strategy is controversial and the 1983 and 2005 cases resulted in complaints to the Federal Constitutional Court, it has been upheld as lawful if the chancellor reasonably believes he can no longer govern effectively with the current balance of power.

==== Promulgation of the law ====
All federal laws must be signed by the president and promulgated in the Federal Law Gazette before they can come into effect. The president may refuse to sign the bill, thus effectively vetoing it. In principle, the president has the unrestricted authority to refuse to sign any bill, but this is not how past presidents handled their power. Historically, presidents have only refused to sign a bill when they have serious doubts about its constitutionality. Since refusal to sign a bill is not a veto in the sense that it does not permanently kill the bill, the president may at their own discretion sign the bill at any later time, if for example the Basic Law has been changed in the relevant aspect or if the bill in question has been amended according to his concerns.

As of 2026, this has happened only nine times and no president has done it more often than two times during their term:

- In 1951, Theodor Heuss refused to sign a bill concerning income and corporation taxes, because it lacked the consent of the Bundesrat (in Germany some bills at the federal level need the consent of the Bundesrat, and some do not, which can be controversial at times).
- In 1961, Heinrich Lübke refused to sign a bill concerning business and workforce trades he believed to be unconstitutional, because of a violation of the free choice of job.
- In 1969, Gustav Heinemann refused to sign the "Engineer Act", because he believed this legislative area to be under the authority of the states.
- In 1970, Gustav Heinemann refused to sign the "Architects Act" for the same reason.
- In 1976, Walter Scheel refused to sign a bill about simplification measures regarding the conscientious objection of conscription, because it lacked the – in his opinion necessary – consent of the Bundesrat.
- In 1991, Richard von Weizsäcker refused to sign an amendment to the "Air Traffic Act" allowing the privatisation of the air traffic administration, which he believed to be unconstitutional. He signed the bill later after the Basic Law was changed in this aspect.
- In 2006, Horst Köhler refused to sign a bill concerning flight control, because he believed it to be unconstitutional.
- Later the same year, Köhler refused to sign the "Consumer Information Act" for the same reason.
- In 2020, Frank-Walter Steinmeier refused to sign the "Hate Speech Act" because of concerns about its constitutionality. In a letter sent to the Bundesrat, he stated his intent to sign the bill, if accordingly amended in a reasonable time. He did so in April 2021.

Karl Carstens, Roman Herzog, Johannes Rau, Christian Wulff, and Joachim Gauck have signed and promulgated all bills during their respective terms.

It is possible, albeit a drastic step which has never happened, that the president refuses to sign legislation merely because they disagree with its content.

==== Legislative state of emergency ====
Article 81 of the Basic Law provides an emergency legislative procedure which makes it possible to enact a law without the approval of the Bundestag.

If a motion of confidence in the chancellor fails, but the Bundestag is not dissolved – either because the chancellor declines to ask for it or the president declines to grant it – and a new chancellor is not elected, the government can declare a bill to be urgent. A bill is also automatically considered urgent for this purpose if it is combined with a confidence motion. If the bill is rejected by the Bundestag, the government with the consent of the Bundesrat can then request the president to declare a "legislative state of emergency" (Gesetzgebungsnotstand) with respect to that specific bill. The president is free to grant or deny the request, and if granted it must be countersigned by the chancellor as an indication they support it and not simply a majority of the cabinet. After the declaration, if the Bundestag rejects the bill again, declines to take action on it within four weeks, or passes it in a form unacceptable to the government, the government may bypass the Bundestag and ask the Bundesrat for approval, with which it becomes law.

After this, another legislative state of emergency may be declared for any other bill meeting the same conditions (absence of confidence in the chancellor; designated urgent by the government; rejected by the Bundestag) for six months after the president's first declaration or the end of the chancellor's term of office, whichever is shorter. If the full six-month period expires with the chancellor still in office, they cannot use this procedure again for the rest of their term. The procedure also cannot be used to amend, suspend, or abrogate the Basic Law. The Bundestag remains fully competent to pass laws on its own during this time.

Such a state of emergency has never been declared. In case of serious disagreement between the chancellor and the Bundestag, the chancellor resigns or the Bundestag faces new elections. The provision of Article 81 is intended to assist the government for a short time, but not to use it in crisis for a longer period. The six months is in fact a relatively brief window; a 1978 report by a Bundestag inquiry committee on constitutional reform estimated it would take 18 weeks to fully pass a single law under the procedure, taking into account the prerequisite conditions leading up to the declaration of an emergency.

According to constitutional commentator Bryde, Article 81 provides the government with an executive emergency decree power (exekutives Notverordnungsrecht), similar to Article 48 of the Weimar Constitution, but for historical reasons the constitution avoided this expression.

== Politics and influence ==
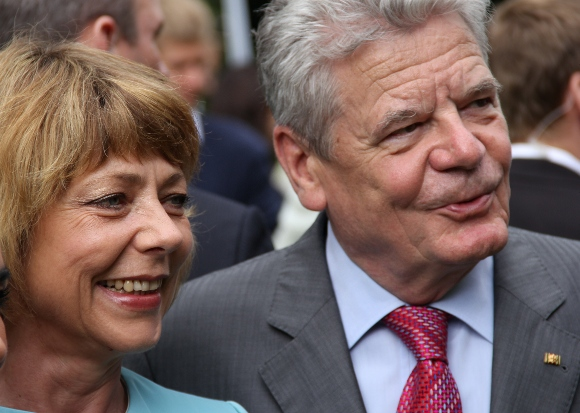
Former president Joachim Gauck and his partner Daniela Schadt

Though candidates are usually selected by a political party or parties, the president nonetheless is traditionally expected to refrain from being an active member of any party after assuming office. Every president to date, except Joachim Gauck (who was an independent), has suspended their party membership for the duration of their term. Presidents have, however, spoken publicly about their personal views on political matters. The very fact that a president is expected to remain above politics usually means that when they do speak out on an issue, it is considered to be of great importance. In some cases, a presidential speech has dominated German political debate for a year or more.

== Succession ==
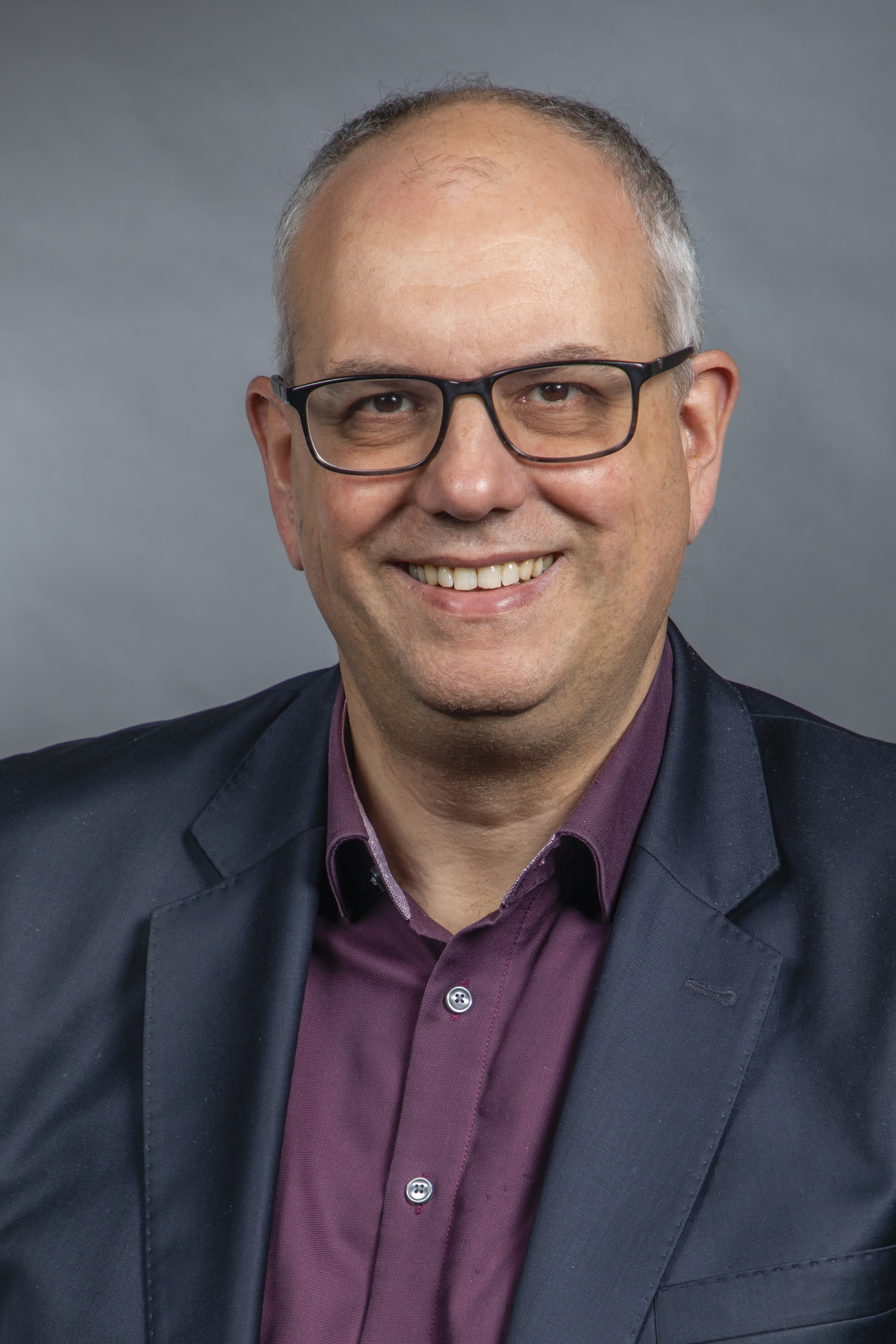
Andreas Bovenschulte, the current president of the Bundesrat and deputy of the president of Germany

The Basic Law did not create an office of Vice President, but designated the president of the Bundesrat (by constitutional custom the head of government of one of the sixteen German states, elected by the Bundesrat in a predetermined order of annual alternation) as deputy of the president of Germany. If the office of president falls vacant, they assume the powers of the president on an acting basis until a successor is elected. While doing so, they do not continue to exercise the role of chair of the Bundesrat. If the president is temporarily unable to perform their duties (this happens frequently, for example if the president is abroad on a state visit), he can at his own discretion delegate his powers or parts of them to the president of the Bundesrat. For example, in early November 2022, then president of the Bundesrat Peter Tschentscher took over for President Steinmeier when the latter was on a trip to Asia.

If the president dies in office, resigns, or is otherwise removed from office, a successor is to be elected within thirty days. So far, there have been three instances of the premature end of a president's term of office:

- 1969: Heinrich Lübke (resignation). Since Lübke had already announced his resignation in October 1968 (9 months in advance), the Federal Convention could be held early as in the case of a regular end of term. Therefore no vacancy occurred.
- 2010: Horst Köhler (resignation). Jens Böhrnsen, President of the Senate of Bremen and President of the Bundesrat, became Acting President.
- 2012 Christian Wulff (resignation). Horst Seehofer, Minister-President of Bavaria and President of the Bundesrat, who became Acting President.

In 1949, Karl Arnold, at the time Minister-President of North Rhine-Westphalia and President of the Bundesrat, also acted as head of state for a few days: after the Basic Law had come into effect and he was elected as President of the Bundesrat, the first president of Germany was not yet elected and the office therefore vacant.

None of these three presidents of the Bundesrat acting as President, has used any of the more important powers of the president, as for example vetoing a law or dissolving the Bundestag, although they would have been entitled to do so under the same conditions as the president.

== Impeachment and removal ==
While in office, the president is immune from prosecution. The only mechanism for removing the president is impeachment by a two-thirds majority of the Bundestag or Bundesrat for willfully violating federal law or the Basic Law. The responsible body then must submit a complaint to the Federal Constitutional Court detailing the action or failure to act which violated the law. The court may suspend the president from his duties while it considers the complaint. If the charge is sustained, the court has the authority to remove the president from office. No president has ever been impeached.

== Presidential office and symbols ==
=== Residences and office ===
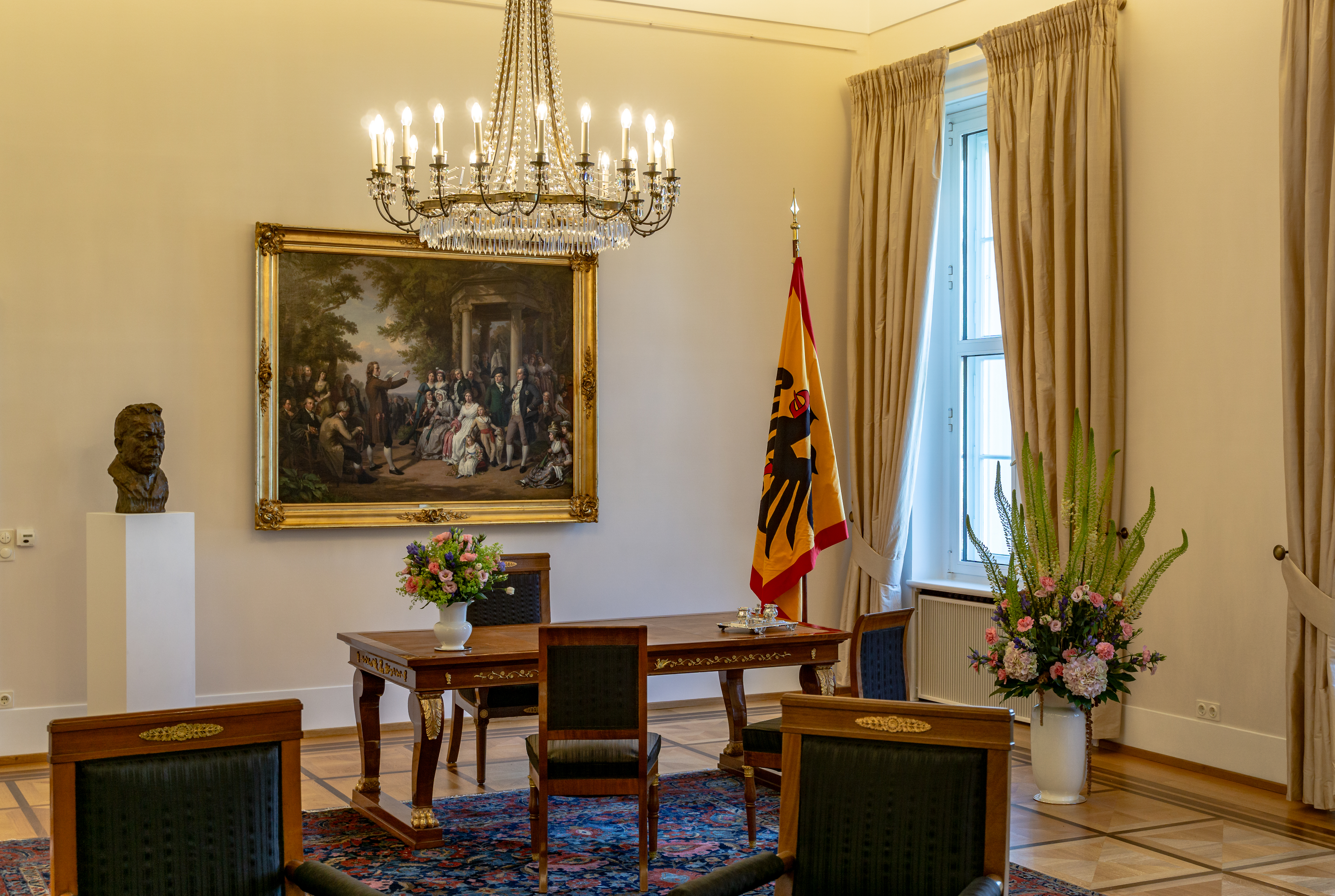
Ceremonial office in Bellevue Palace

The official residence of the president is Bellevue Palace in Berlin. The president's second official residence is the Hammerschmidt Villa in Bonn, the former capital city of West Germany.

Beginning in 2026, due to renovation works at Bellevue Palace, the president's seat in Berlin was temporarily moved to the official residence in the Spreebogen.

Although these are the president's official residences, they do not live in Bellevue palace. Instead, it is only used as a ceremonial office. The president and their spouse live in Villa Wurmbach in Dahlem which is part of the Berlin borough of Steglitz-Zehlendorf.

The Office of the President (Bundespräsidialamt) is a supreme federal authority. It organises the president's work, supports the president in the performance of their duties as head of state, and coordinate their working relationships with other parts of the German government and administration. Its top official, who takes precedence over all other German state secretaries, is the Head of the Office of the President (Chef des Bundespräsidialamts).

The office and its staff advise the president, inform them of all developments in domestic and foreign affairs and carry out the instructions of the president or forward these to the corresponding ministry or authority.

=== Transportation ===
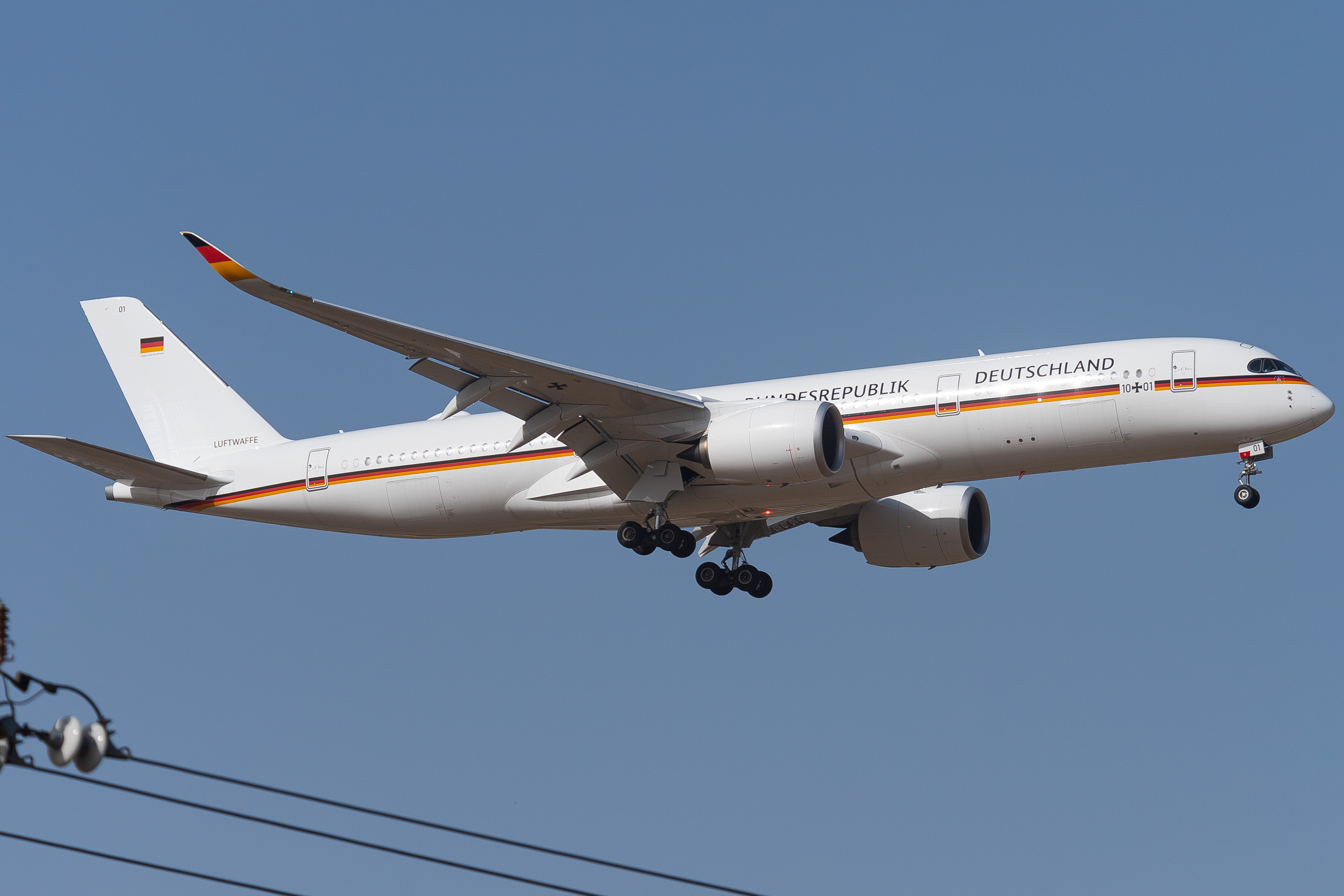
Airbus A350 aircraft used by the president

The president's car is usually black, made in Germany and has the numberplate "0 – 1" with the presidential standard on the right wing of the car. The president also uses a VIP helicopter operated by the Federal Police and VIP aircraft (Bombardier Global 5000, Airbus A319CJ, Airbus A321, or A350) operated by the Executive Transport Wing of the German Air Force. When the president is on board, the flight's callsign is "German Airforce 001".

== History ==
=== Weimar Republic (1919-1945) ===
The position of president of Germany was first established by the Weimar Constitution, which was drafted in the aftermath of World War I and the abdication of Emperor Wilhelm II in 1918. In german the new head of state was called the Reichspräsident.

The Weimar Constitution created a semi-presidential system in which power was divided between the president, a cabinet, and a parliament. The president thus had an active political role rather than a largely ceremonial one. He had the power appointed the chancellor and, at his recommendation, appointed and dismissed members of the cabinet as well. The Reichstag (parliament) could only remove the chancellor by a vote of no confidence. All bills had to receive the signature of the president to become law and, although he did not have an absolute veto on legislation, he could insist that a law be submitted for the approval of voters in a referendum. The president had the authority to dissolve the Reichstag at his own discretion, conduct foreign affairs, and had command the armed forces. Article 48 of the constitution provided the president sweeping powers in the event of a crisis. If there was a threat to "public order and security", he could, with the co-signature of the chancellor (per article 50), suspend civil rights and legislate by decree.

The Weimar constitution provided that the president be directly elected and serve a seven-year term. The election involved a form of the two-round system. The first president was elected by the National Assembly and subsequently only two direct presidential elections took place. They were the election of Paul von Hindenburg in 1925 and his re-election in 1932. The office ceased to exist with the death of Hindenburg in 1934, after which it was merged with the office of chancellor.

=== Federal Republic of Germany ("West Germany", 1949–1990, "Germany", 1990-present) ===
With the promulgation of the Basic Law in 1949, the office of President was re-created in the Federal Republic of Germany (due to the german separation, West Germany from 1949–1990).

In comparison with the role of the presidency in the Weimar Republic, the President's role in the formation of the government is significantly reduced: The Chancellor is now elected by the Bundestag, and his subsequent appointment by the President is a mere formality. Although the President has the right to nominate a candidate for the first round of voting, the Bundestag is free to reject that nomination and to nominate and elect other candidates in subsequent rounds. The President is also still involved in the legislative process, insofar as every law requires his signature at the end of the process. In constitutional practice, however, this provision has not given rise to a right of veto, but merely to a right to review a bill for obvious violations of the constitution. The President has also lost the right to submit a bill to a referendum (the Basic Law does not, in principle, provide for referendums at the federal level).

The President now derives genuine political power primarily from reserve powers that allow him to resolve parliamentary deadlock situations. This, however, applies only in two very specific cases: when the Bundestag fails to elect a chancellor with an absolute majority over 14 days after the first ballot, or if a chancellor loses a vote of confidence. In the former case, he may alternatively dissolve the Bundestag or appoint a chancellor elected by a plurality on the last ballot; in the latter case, he may – if the chancellor requests it – dissolve the Bundestag or declare a legislative state of emergency (in either case, he may also reject the Chancellor's motion). Other powers which the President may exercise at his or her discretion, but which are of little practical significance, include the right to grant pardons at federal level (most criminal proceedings take place at state level) and the right to convene the Bundestag. Otherwise, most of the President’s official acts require the countersignature of a member of the Federal Government, thereby ensuring that he can only act in accordance with the Government’s consent.

This significant curtailment of power was accompanied by a deliberate reduction in the president's democratic legitimacy. The president is no longer elected directly, but rather by an electoral college – the Federal Convention – composed of the members of the Bundestag and representatives of the state legislatures.

Because the reunification of Germany in 1990 was accomplished by the five reorganised East German states joining the Federal Republic, the president became the president of all German states without the establishment of a new presidential office. Richard von Weizsäcker thus became the first president of a reunified Germany on 3 October 1990. The first president to be elected by a pan-german Federal Convention was Roman Herzog in 1994.

=== German Democratic Republic ("East Germany", 1949-1960) ===
The German Democratic Republic established the office of a head of state with the title of President of the Republic (German: Präsident der Republik) in 1949, but abandoned the office with the death of the first president, Wilhelm Pieck, in 1960 in favour of a collective head of state closely modelled on its Soviet counterpart. All government positions of the country, including the presidency, were appointed by the ruling Socialist Unity Party of Germany on the approval of the Communist Party of the Soviet Union. Following the end of communist rule due to the Peaceful Revolution, the head of state became the parliamentary speaker with new, fair elections. Later that year, a draft constitution was written that would have restored the presidency, but ultimately this never materialised.

== List of presidents ==
List of presidents of Germany from 1949 – till date.
No.	Portrait	Name (Birth–Death)	Term	Party	Election	Deputies (Presidents of the Bundesrat)
President of the Bundesrat Karl Arnold acted as President from 7 to 12 September 1949.
1		Theodor Heuss (1884–1963)	12 September 1949 – 12 September 1959	FDP	1949	Karl Arnold (1949–1950); Hans Ehard (1950–1951); Hinrich Wilhelm Kopf (1951–1952); Reinhold Maier (1952–1953); Georg August Zinn (1953–1954); Peter Altmeier (1954–1955); Kai-Uwe von Hassel (1955–1956); Kurt Sieveking (1956–1957); Willy Brandt (1957–1958); Wilhelm Kaisen (1958–1959)
1		Theodor Heuss (1884–1963)	12 September 1949 – 12 September 1959	FDP	1954	Karl Arnold (1949–1950); Hans Ehard (1950–1951); Hinrich Wilhelm Kopf (1951–1952); Reinhold Maier (1952–1953); Georg August Zinn (1953–1954); Peter Altmeier (1954–1955); Kai-Uwe von Hassel (1955–1956); Kurt Sieveking (1956–1957); Willy Brandt (1957–1958); Wilhelm Kaisen (1958–1959)
2		Heinrich Lübke (1894–1972)	13 September 1959 – 30 June 1969 (Note: On 14 October 1968, Lübke announced his resignation with effect to 30 June 1969, to make possible the election of his successor before the federal election campaign in the fall of 1969.)	CDU	1959	Wilhelm Kaisen (1959); Franz Josef Röder (1959–1960); Franz Meyers (1960–1961); Hans Ehard (1961–1962); Kurt Georg Kiesinger (1962–1963); Georg Diederichs (1963–1964); Georg August Zinn (1964–1965); Peter Altmeier (1965–1966); Helmut Lemke (1966–1967); Klaus Schütz (1967–1968); Herbert Weichmann (1968–1969)
2		Heinrich Lübke (1894–1972)	13 September 1959 – 30 June 1969	CDU	1964	Wilhelm Kaisen (1959); Franz Josef Röder (1959–1960); Franz Meyers (1960–1961); Hans Ehard (1961–1962); Kurt Georg Kiesinger (1962–1963); Georg Diederichs (1963–1964); Georg August Zinn (1964–1965); Peter Altmeier (1965–1966); Helmut Lemke (1966–1967); Klaus Schütz (1967–1968); Herbert Weichmann (1968–1969)
3		Gustav Heinemann (1899–1976)	1 July 1969 – 30 June 1974	SPD	1969	Herbert Weichmann (1969); Franz Josef Röder (1969–1970); Hans Koschnick (1970–1971); Heinz Kühn (1971–1972); Alfons Goppel (1972–1973); Hans Filbinger (1973–1974)
4		Walter Scheel (1919–2016)	1 July 1974 – 30 June 1979	FDP	1974	Hans Filbinger (1974); Alfred Kubel (1974–1975); Albert Osswald (1975–1976); Bernhard Vogel (1976–1977); Gerhard Stoltenberg (1977–1978); Dietrich Stobbe (1978–1979)
5		Karl Carstens (1914–1992)	1 July 1979 – 30 June 1984	CDU	1979	Dietrich Stobbe (1979); Hans-Ulrich Klose (1979–1980); Werner Zeyer (1980–1981); Hans Koschnick (1981–1982); Johannes Rau (1982–1983); Franz Josef Strauß (1983–1984)
6		Richard von Weizsäcker (1920–2015)	1 July 1984 – 30 June 1994	CDU	1984	Franz Josef Strauß (1984); Lothar Späth (1984–1985); Ernst Albrecht (1985–1986); Holger Börner (1986–1987); Walter Wallmann (1987); Bernhard Vogel (1987–1988); Björn Engholm (1988–1989); Walter Momper (1989–1990); Henning Voscherau (1990–1991); Alfred Gomolka (1991–1992); Berndt Seite (1992); Oskar Lafontaine (1992–1993); Klaus Wedemeier (1993–1994)
6		Richard von Weizsäcker (1920–2015)	1 July 1984 – 30 June 1994	CDU	1989	Franz Josef Strauß (1984); Lothar Späth (1984–1985); Ernst Albrecht (1985–1986); Holger Börner (1986–1987); Walter Wallmann (1987); Bernhard Vogel (1987–1988); Björn Engholm (1988–1989); Walter Momper (1989–1990); Henning Voscherau (1990–1991); Alfred Gomolka (1991–1992); Berndt Seite (1992); Oskar Lafontaine (1992–1993); Klaus Wedemeier (1993–1994)
7		Roman Herzog (1934–2017)	1 July 1994 – 30 June 1999	CDU	1994	Klaus Wedemeier (1994); Johannes Rau (1994–1995); Edmund Stoiber (1995–1996); Erwin Teufel (1996–1997); Gerhard Schröder (1997–1998); Hans Eichel (1998–1999); Roland Koch (1999)
8		Johannes Rau (1931–2006)	1 July 1999 – 30 June 2004	SPD	1999	Roland Koch (1999); Kurt Biedenkopf (1999–2000); Kurt Beck (2000–2001); Klaus Wowereit (2001–2002); Wolfgang Böhmer (2002–2003); Dieter Althaus (2003–2004)
9		Horst Köhler (1943–2025)	1 July 2004 – 31 May 2010 (Note: On 31 May 2010, Köhler declared his resignation with immediate effect.)	CDU	2004	Dieter Althaus (2004); Matthias Platzeck (2004–2005); Peter Harry Carstensen (2005–2006); Harald Ringstorff (2006–2007); Ole von Beust (2007–2008); Peter Müller (2008–2009); Jens Böhrnsen (2009–2010)
9		Horst Köhler (1943–2025)	1 July 2004 – 31 May 2010	CDU	2009	Dieter Althaus (2004); Matthias Platzeck (2004–2005); Peter Harry Carstensen (2005–2006); Harald Ringstorff (2006–2007); Ole von Beust (2007–2008); Peter Müller (2008–2009); Jens Böhrnsen (2009–2010)
President of the Bundesrat Jens Böhrnsen acted as President from 31 May to 30 June 2010.
10		Christian Wulff (b. 1959)	30 June 2010 – 17 February 2012 (Note: On 17 February 2012, Wulff declared his resignation with immediate effect.)	CDU	2010	Jens Böhrnsen (2010); Hannelore Kraft (2010–2011); Horst Seehofer (2011–2012)
President of the Bundesrat Horst Seehofer acted as President from 17 February to 18 March 2012.
11		Joachim Gauck (b. 1940)	18 March 2012 – 18 March 2017	Independent	2012	Horst Seehofer (2012); Winfried Kretschmann (2012–2013); Stephan Weil (2013–2014); Volker Bouffier (2014–2015); Stanislaw Tillich (2015–2016); Malu Dreyer (2016–2017)
12		Frank-Walter Steinmeier (b. 1956)	19 March 2017 – Incumbent	SPD	2017	Malu Dreyer (2017); Michael Müller (2017–2018); Daniel Günther (2018–2019); Dietmar Woidke (2019–2020); Reiner Haseloff (2020–2021); Bodo Ramelow (2021–2022); Peter Tschentscher (2022–2023); Manuela Schwesig (2023–2024); Anke Rehlinger (2024–2025); Andreas Bovenschulte (2025–2026); Hendrik Wüst (Incumbent)
12		Frank-Walter Steinmeier (b. 1956)	19 March 2017 – Incumbent	SPD	2022	Malu Dreyer (2017); Michael Müller (2017–2018); Daniel Günther (2018–2019); Dietmar Woidke (2019–2020); Reiner Haseloff (2020–2021); Bodo Ramelow (2021–2022); Peter Tschentscher (2022–2023); Manuela Schwesig (2023–2024); Anke Rehlinger (2024–2025); Andreas Bovenschulte (2025–2026); Hendrik Wüst (Incumbent)

== Trivia ==
Most German presidents since 1949 were career politicians before taking office, who had already held important posts at federal or state level:

- Theodor Heuss was a member of the Reichstag during the Weimar Republic (1924–1932) and, after the Second World War, Minister of Culture for Württemberg-Baden (1945–1946), a member of the Parliamentary Council and a member of the Bundestag (1949)
- Heinrich Lübke was a member of the Prussian State Parliament during the Weimar Republic; after the Second World War, he was a member of the State Parliament of North Rhine-Westphalia (1946–1954), where he served as Minister for Agriculture from 1947 to 1953, a Member of the Bundestag (1949–1950 and 1953–1959) and Federal Minister for Agriculture from 1953 to 1959.
- Gustav Heinemann was a member of the State Parliament of North Rhine-Westphalia (1947–1950), Federal Minister of the Interior (1949–1950) and of Justice (1966–1969), and a member of the Bundestag (1957–1969)
- Walter Scheel was a member of the State Parliament of North Rhine-Westphalia (1950–1954), a member of the Bundestag (1953–1974), a Member of the European Parliament (1956–1969), Federal Minister for Economic Co-operation (1961–1966), Federal Minister for Foreign Affairs and Vice-Chancellor (1969–1974)
- Karl Carstens was a Member of the Bundestag (1972–1979) and its President from 1976 to 1979
- Richard von Weizsäcker was a Member of the German Bundestag (1969–1981), its Vice-President from 1979 to 1981, and Governing Mayor of Berlin (1981–1984)
- Roman Herzog was Minister for Culture (1978–1980) and Minister of the Interior of Baden-Württemberg (1980–1983); from 1983 to 1994 he was a judge at the Federal Constitutional Court, serving as its Vice-President until 1987 and subsequently as its President
- Johannes Rau was a member of the State Parliament of North Rhine-Westphalia (1958–1999), serving as Minister for Science (1970–1978) and Minister-President (1978–1998); in the latter role, he also served twice as President of the Bundesrat (1982–1983 and 1994–1995)
- Christian Wulff was a member of the Lower Saxony State Parliament (1994–2010) and served as Minister-President there from 2003 to 2010; in this capacity, he was President of the Bundesrat from 2007 to 2008
- Frank-Walter Steinmeier was Head of the Federal Chancellery (1999–2005), Federal Minister for Foreign Affairs (2005–2009 and 2013–2017) and Vice-Chancellor (2007–2009)

The two exceptions to date have been Horst Köhler and Joachim Gauck:

- Before his election as President, Horst Köhler did not hold any elected political office, but instead pursued a career as an international financial expert, senior civil servant and economic policy-maker, most recently as Managing Director of the International Monetary Fund (2000–2004)
- Joachim Gauck was a pastor and civil rights activist in the GDR; in 1990, he was briefly a member of parliament – first as a member of the GDR’s last and only freely elected People’s Chamber, and then, following reunification, as a member of the Bundestag for only one day. He resigned his seat, after he was appointed as the first Federal Commissioner for the Stasi Records (1990–2000)

To date, only five out of twelve federal presidents have been re-elected for a second term (Heuss, Lübke, von Weizsäcker, Köhler and Steinmeier). Only Theodor Heuss and Richard von Weizsäcker have served two full five-year-terms (Lübke and Köhler resigned during their second terms; Steinmeier’s second term is still ongoing). Christian Wulff, the only president to have resigned during his first term, has served the shortest tenure (1 year, 7 months and 18 days) of any federal president to date (as of November 2026).

== See also ==
- President of Germany (1919–1945)
- Chancellor of Germany
- Federal Government of Germany
