= Official residence in the Spreebogen =

Seat of the German president in Berlin

- The building flying the presidential standard

General information
- Location: Elisabeth-Abegg-Straße 2, Moabit, Berlin
- Coordinates: 52.522°N 13.367°E
- Year built: 2023–2026
- Cost: €205,000,000
- Client: President of Germany, Bundespräsidialamt
- Owner: Institute for Federal Real Estate

Technical details
- Floor area: 18,700 m^{2} (201,000 sq ft)

Design and construction
- Architecture firm: Sauerbruch Hutton

The official residence in the Spreebogen is a building in Berlin serving as interim seat of the president of Germany since July 2026.

== Background ==
Bellevue Palace in then-West Berlin became the secondary residence of the German president in 1959. After German reunification, the primary seat of the president was moved from Villa Hammerschmidt in Bonn to Bellevue Palace in 1994. The palace last underwent renovations in 2004–2005.

Bellevue Palace requires new extensive renovations which cannot be done while the building is in use. This work will cost at least €600 million and take an estimated eight years. No suitable existing building could be found in Berlin for the president to relocate to during this time, necessitating the construction of a new interim residence. Construction began in April 2023 and took three years. The president formally moved residences on 10 July 2026. After the interim period, the building is intended to be used by other federal agencies.

== Building ==
The building is located near the river Spree within view of the Federal Chancellery and other government buildings. It has a usable floor area of 9,900 m^{2} (107,000 sq ft) out of a total 18,700 m^{2} (201,000 sq ft). There are 179 offices spread over multiple floors. Representative rooms for receptions and other official functions occupy the uppermost floor.

The residence was built using modular construction mostly from prefabricated wooden modules. The facade is panelled with ceramic tiles in multiple colours.
