= Bundespräsidialamt =

Personal office and staff for the Federal President of Germany

Coordinates: 52.5164°N 13.3511°E

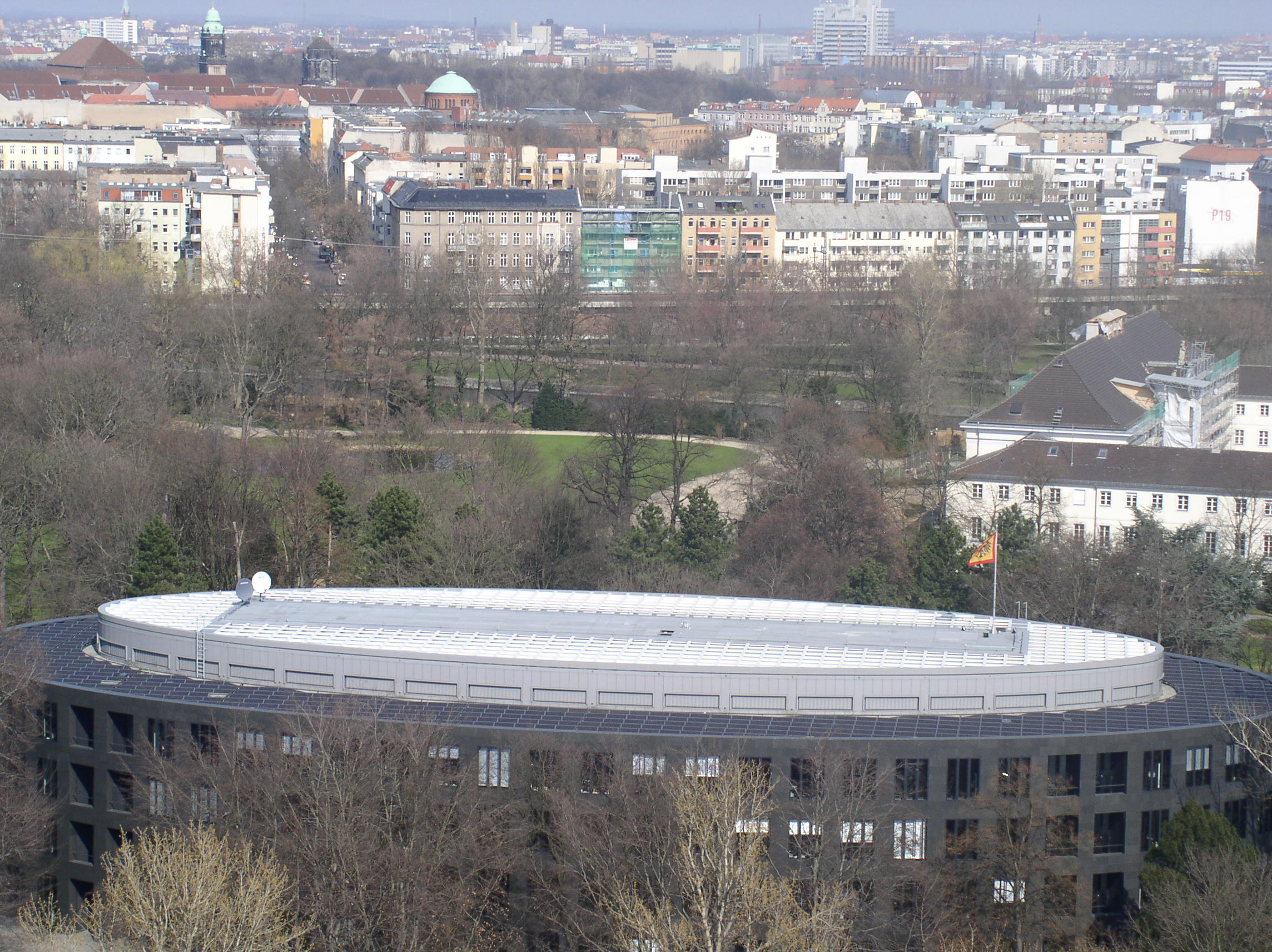
Close view of the Bundespräsidialamt building

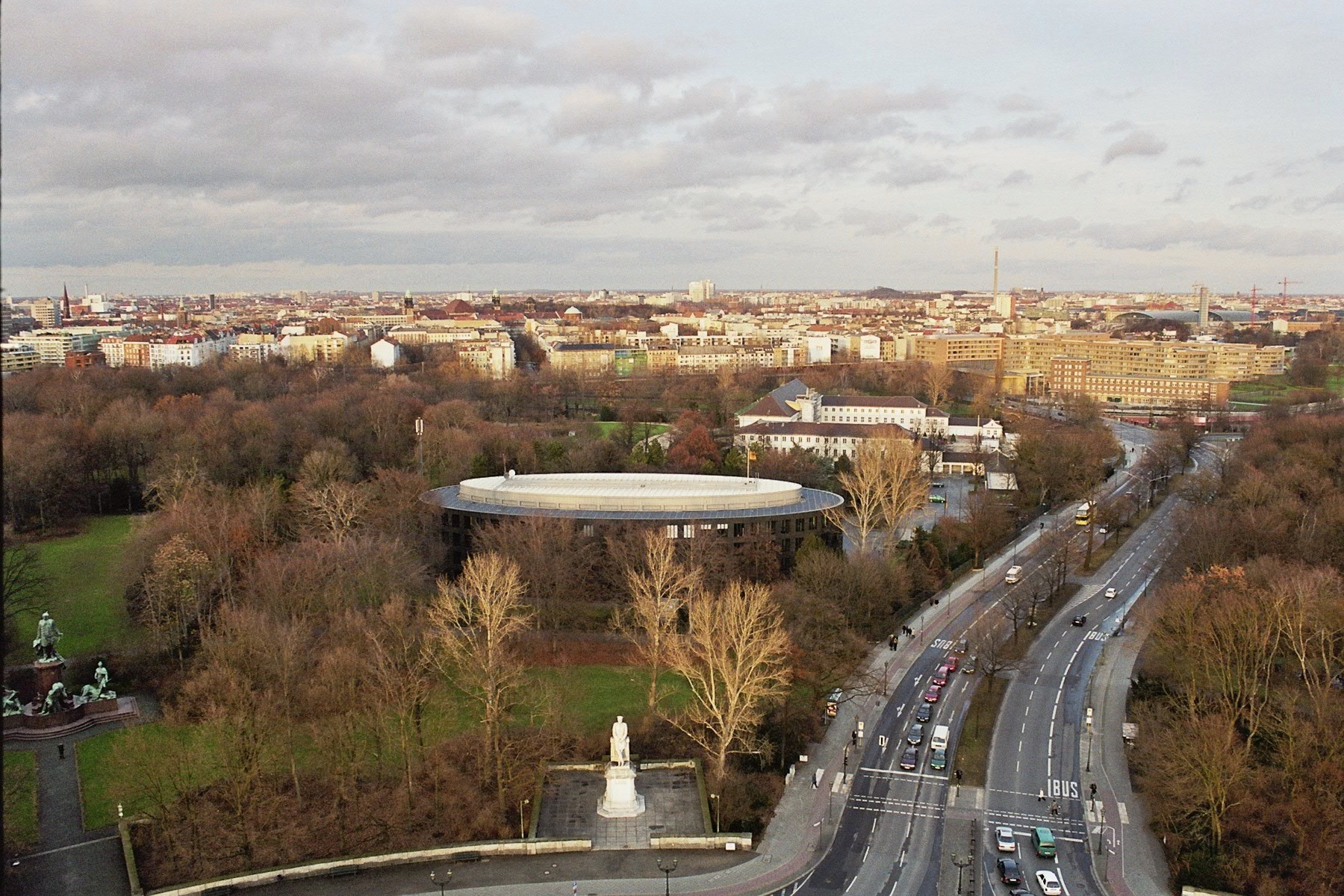
The Bundespräsidialamt building and its surroundings

The Bundespräsidialamt (German: [ˌbʊndəspʁɛziˈdi̯aːlˌʔamt]; "Office of the Federal President") is a federal agency (German: "oberste Bundesbehörde") of the Government of Germany assisting the President of Germany.

The office building is situated beneath Bellevue Palace in Tiergarten in Berlin. The seat was formerly in Bonn in the Villa Hammerschmidt and switched to Berlin with the Berlin-Bonn Act. The agency moved into the actual building in 1998.

The current head of the Bundespräsidialamt is State Secretary Dörte Dinger.

== Heads of Bundespräsidialamt ==
Manfred Klaiber	1903–1981	1949–1957
Karl Theodor Bleek	1898–1969	1957–1961
Hans-Heinrich Herwarth von Bittenfeld	1904–1999	1961–1965
Hans Berger	1909–1985	1965–1969
Dietrich Spangenberg	1922–1990	1969–1974
Paul Frank	1918–2011	1974–1979
Hans Neusel	1927–2013	1979–1984
Klaus Blech	1928–2022	1984–1989
Andreas Meyer-Landrut	* 1929	1989–1994
Wilhelm Staudacher	* 1945	1994–1999
Rüdiger Frohn	* 1950	1999–2004
Michael Jansen	* 1941	2004–2006
Gert Haller	1944–2010	2006–2009
Hans-Jürgen Wolff	* 1958	2009–2010
Lothar Hagebölling	* 1952	2010–2012
David Gill	* 1966	2012–2017
Stephan Steinlein	* 1961	2017–2022
Dörte Dinger	* 1981	since 2022
