= Villa Wurmbach =

Villa in Dahlem, Berlin, Germany

Coordinates: 52°28′09″N 13°17′04″E

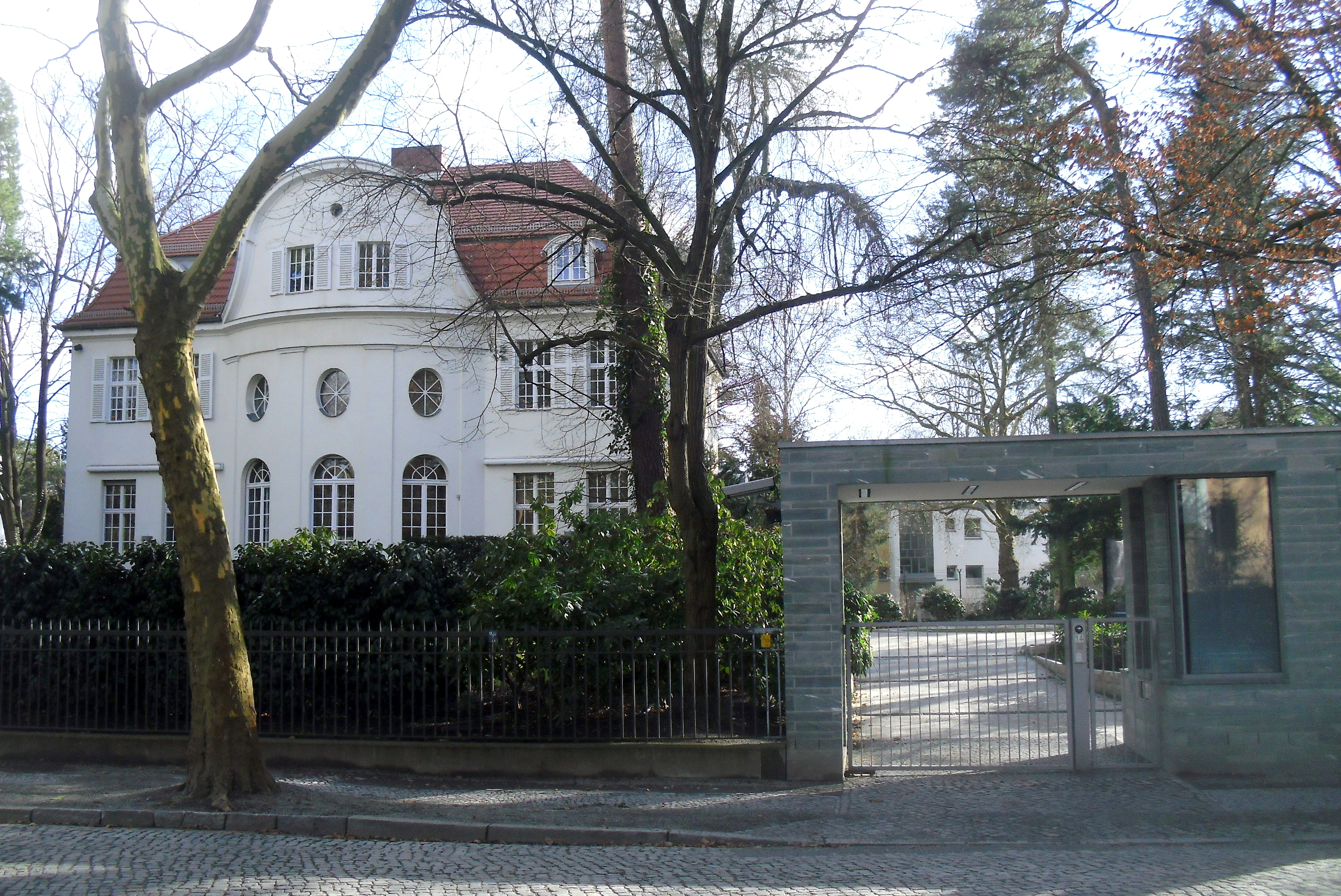
Villa Wurmbach in 2010

Villa Wurmbach is a German villa located in Berlin-Dahlem. It is named after the entrepreneur Julius Wurmbach. Wurmbach had it built in 1912/13 in Dahlem (then located southwest of Berlin), in the Reform style. The villa has been used as the official residence of the president of Germany since 2004. It was the residence of Horst Köhler, Christian Wulff and Joachim Gauck. It is currently occupied by Frank-Walter Steinmeier.

Wurmbach ran into financial difficulties due to inflation between 1914 and 1923 and committed suicide in October 1926.

In November 1926, Hugo Heymann (de) purchased the villa from Wurmbach's estate, with 400 m² of living space plus attic and basement, for 150,000 Reichsmark. He invested a further 20,000 Reichsmarks in renovations and extensions.

Wilhelm Sollmann (SPD), a member of the Reichstag and long-time friend of the Heymanns, warned the couple in autumn 1932 that ‘terrible times’ lay ahead for Jews in Germany. Heymann took the warning seriously and in December 1932 commissioned an estate agent to find a buyer for the villa. The sale of the villa to Waldemar Gerber took place on 7 February 1933, one week after Hitler and the Nazi regime had seized power. The publisher Waldemar Gerber (1888–1968) from Potsdam, editor of the Potsdam daily newspaper, bought it for 86,000 Reichsmarks.

In 1953, Gerber sold the house to the energy company AEG.

In 1962, the Federal Republic of Germany bought Villa Wurmbach from AEG and used it as a guest house. Renovated in 1998, Villa Wurmbach was the residence of Federal Chancellor Gerhard Schröder from 1999 to 2001.
