= Hammerschmidt Villa =

- Villa Hammerschmidt
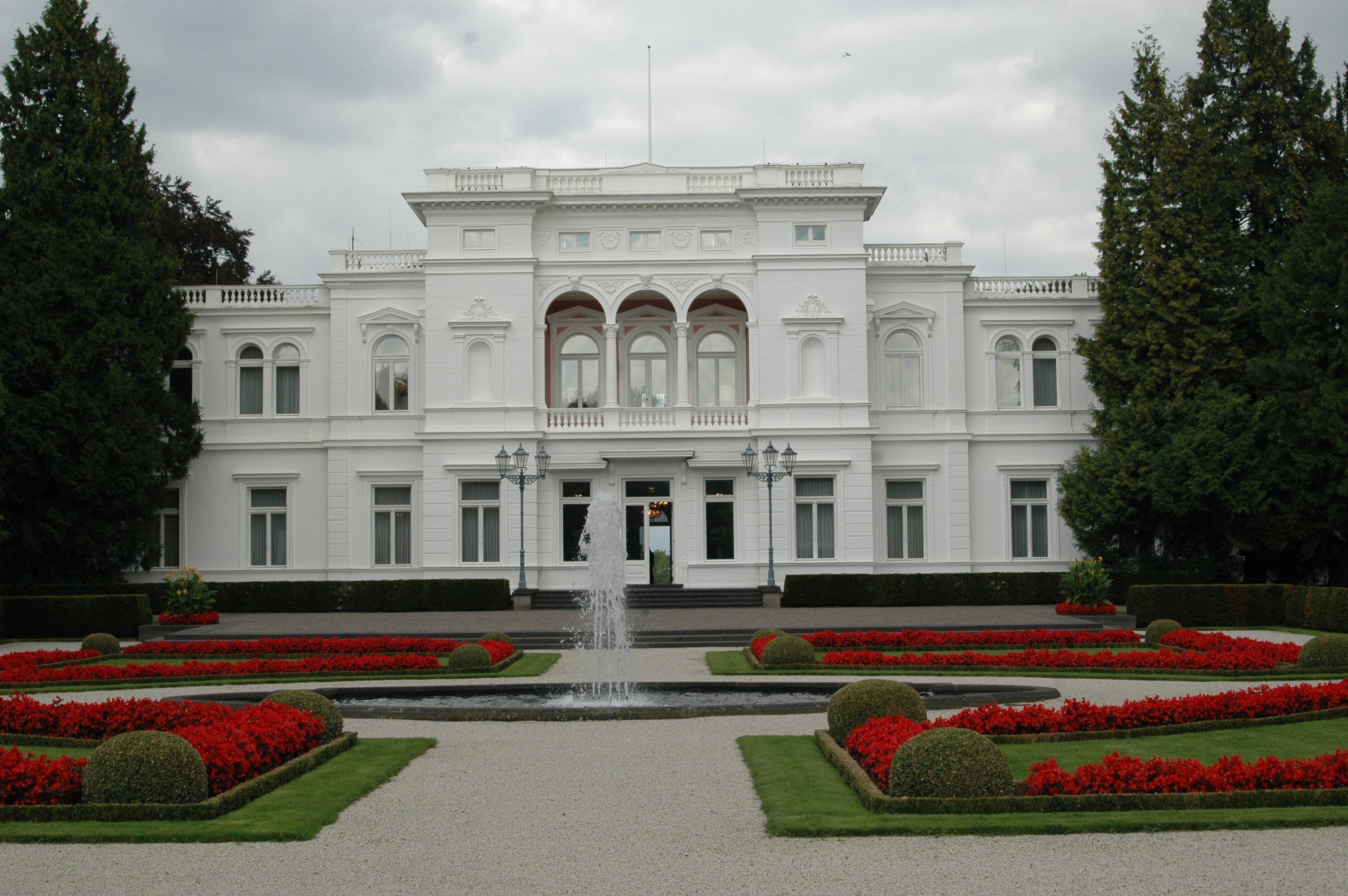
- Interactive map of the Hammerschmidt Villa area

General information
- Status: Completed
- Type: Official residence (secondary)
- Architectural style: Neo-classical
- Location: Bonn, Germany
- Coordinates: 50°43′22″N 7°07′03″E
- Current tenants: President of Germany (secondary)
- Named for: Rudolf Hammerschmidt
- Completed: 1860
- Renovated: 1868
- Owner: Federal Republic of Germany

Design and construction
- Architect: August Dieckhoff

Hammerschmidt Villa (German: Villa Hammerschmidt) is a villa in the German city of Bonn that served as the primary official seat and primary official residence of the president of the Federal Republic of Germany from 1950 until 1994. President Richard von Weizsäcker made Bellevue Palace in Berlin his primary official seat and residence in 1994. In German, the villa is also called the "White House of Bonn". It served as a political symbol of West Germany and its capital, Bonn.

Since 1994, the Hammerschmidt Villa has been the secondary official seat and secondary official residence of the president of Germany. The president's standard is flown above Hammerschmidt Villa when the president is in Bonn.

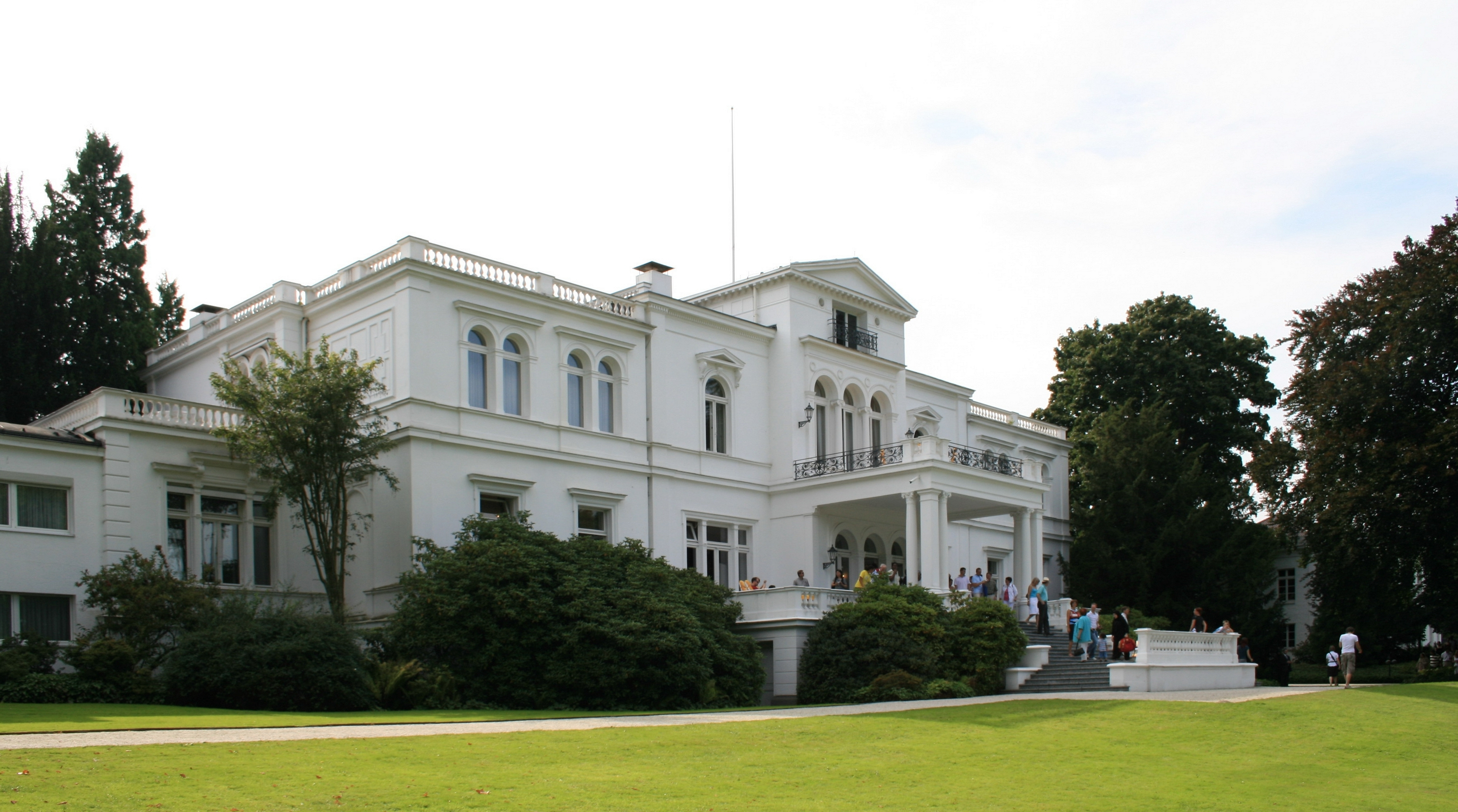
Rear view of Villa Hammerschmidt

The villa is situated in the heart of the former government quarter of Bonn, bordering the river Rhine to the north and opposite the zoological Museum Koenig to the south. It is also adjacent to the secondary official seat and secondary official residence of the chancellor, the Palais Schaumburg, to the west.

The upper floor of the building houses a private apartment for the German president, while the ground floor consists of state rooms which are used for ceremonial purposes.

Villa Hammerschmidt was built by August Dieckhoff in 1860 in neoclassical style as a stately home for a wealthy industrialist. It was redecorated in 1868 by the architect Otto Penner.

== Past owners ==
Since its construction, Villa Hammerschmidt has been owned by:

- Albrecht Troost (1860–1868)
- Leopold Koenig (1868–1899), his son Alexander Koenig was the founder of the Zoologisches Reichsmuseum Alexander Koenig just opposite Villa Hammerschmidt
- Rudolf Hammerschmidt (1899–1928)
- Sold at auction and broken up into several flats (1928–1945)
- Requisitioned by the British occupation forces in Germany following World War II (1945–1949)
- Federal Republic of Germany (since 1950)
