= Ewald Bucher =

German politician (1914–1991)

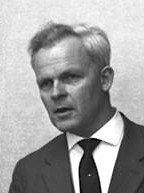
- Bucher in 1964

Member of the Bundestag
- In office 6 October 1953 – 19 October 1969

Personal details
- Born: 19 July 1914 Rottenburg am Neckar
- Died: 31 October 1991 (aged 77) Mutlangen
- Party: FDP

Ewald Bucher (19 July 1914 in Rottenburg am Neckar, Kingdom of Württemberg – 31 October 1991 in Mutlangen) was a German politician of the FDP.

He received a Juris Doctor from the Ludwig-Maximilians-Universität München in 1941 and served then as a soldier in World War II from 1941 to 1944. During the Third Reich, he was a member of the Nazi Party and of the SA. After the Second World War he joined the Free Democratic Party. From 1945 to 1953, he was a lawyer in Schwäbisch Gmünd.

From December 1962 to March 1965, he was West German Minister of Justice. In 1964, he tried to become the West German Bundespräsident, but Heinrich Lübke was re-elected.

From October 1965 to October 1966, he was West German Minister for regional planning, construction and urban development. He and three other FDP-Ministers resigned in October 1966 to make the downfall of Chancellor Ludwig Erhard complete.

From 1953 to 1969, he was a member of the West German Bundestag.

From 1984, he was a member of the CDU.

== Literature ==
Herbst, Ludolf; Jahn, Bruno (2002). Vierhaus, Rudolf (ed.). Biographisches Handbuch der Mitglieder des Deutschen Bundestages. 1949–2002 [Biographical Handbook of the Members of the German Bundestag. 1949–2002] (in German). München: De Gruyter – De Gruyter Saur. p. 1715. ISBN 978-3-11-184511-1.
