= 1964 West German presidential election =

- 1 July 1964
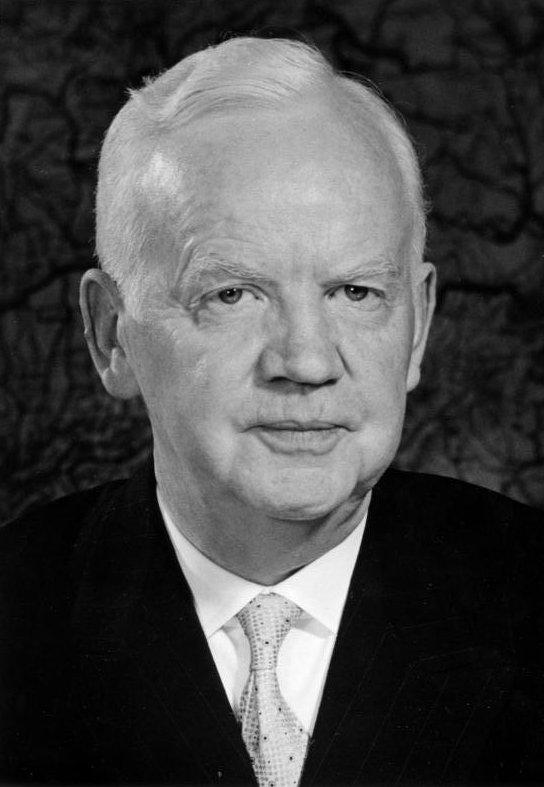

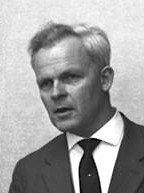
Nominee	Heinrich Lübke	Ewald Bucher
Party	CDU	FDP
Electoral vote	710	123
Percentage	68.1%	11.8%
Nominators	CDU/CSU, SPD	FDP
President before election
Heinrich Lübke
CDU
Elected President
Heinrich Lübke
CDU

An indirect presidential election (officially the 4th Federal Convention) was held in West Germany on 1 July 1964. President Heinrich Lübke was renominated by the Christian Democratic Union. The Free Democratic Party nominated justice minister Ewald Bucher. The Social Democratic Party was divided. The official party line was that they supported President Lübke's re-election. Some have speculated this was a first move towards the grand-coalition that brought Kurt Kiesinger to power two years later. However, the high number of abstentions seems to indicate that not all members of the SPD caucus agreed with this move, as does the fact that Ewald Bucher received at least 19 votes from outside his own party.

== Composition of the Federal Convention ==
The president is elected by the Federal Convention consisting of all the members of the Bundestag and an equal number of delegates representing the states. These are divided proportionally by population to each state, and each state's delegation is divided among the political parties represented in its parliament so as to reflect the partisan proportions in the parliament.

By party		By state	
Party	Members	State	Members
CDU/CSU	485	Bundestag	521
SPD	445	Baden-Württemberg	73
FDP	104	Bavaria	89
BP	3	Berlin	20
GB/BHE	2	Bremen	6
SVP	1	Hamburg	17
DPS	1	Hesse	45
Independents	1	Lower Saxony	61
Total	1042	North Rhine-Westphalia	147
		Rhineland-Palatinate	32
		Saarland	10
		Schleswig-Holstein	21
		Total	1042

Source: Eine Dokumentation aus Anlass der Wahl des Bundespräsidenten am 18. März 2012

== Results ==
Candidate	Parties	Votes	%
Heinrich Lübke	CDU/CSU, SPD	710	68.1
Ewald Bucher	FDP	123	11.8
Abstentions		187	17.9
Invalid votes		4	0.4
Not present		18	1.7
Total		1,042	100
Source: Bundestag
