= 1959 West German presidential election =

- 1 July 1959
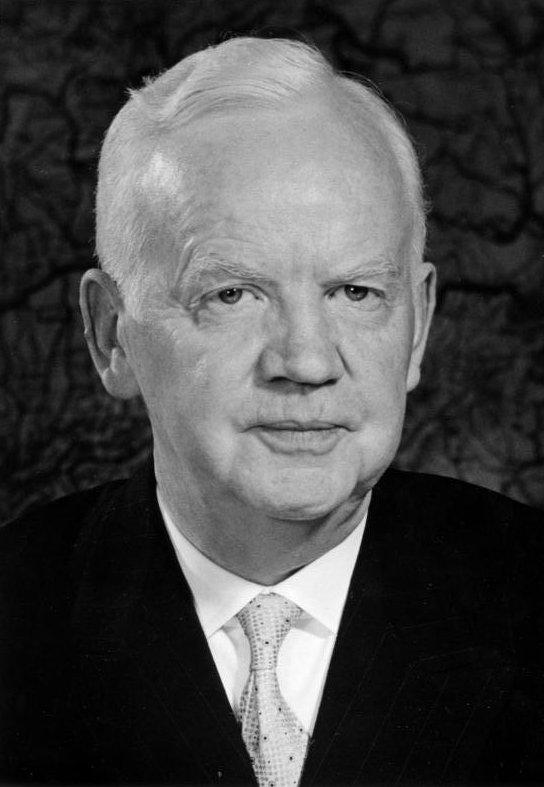

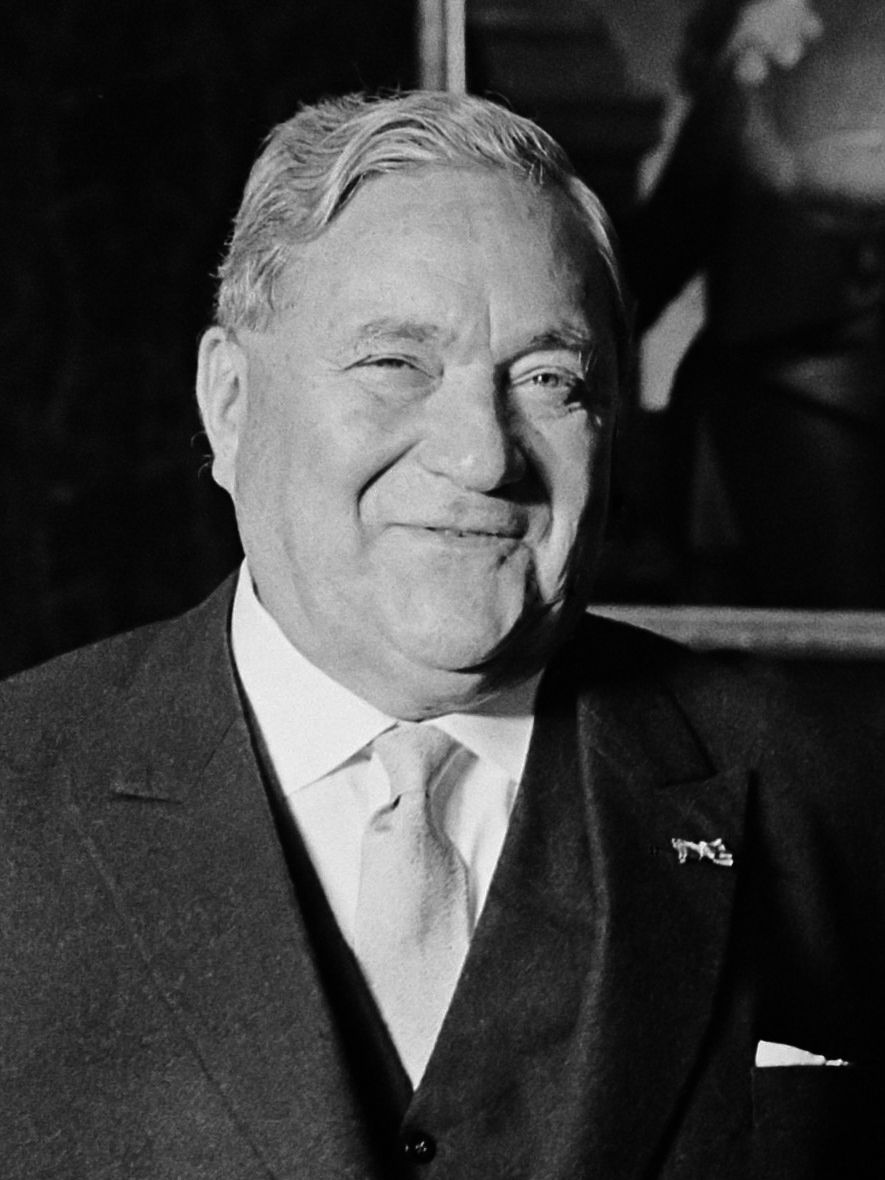

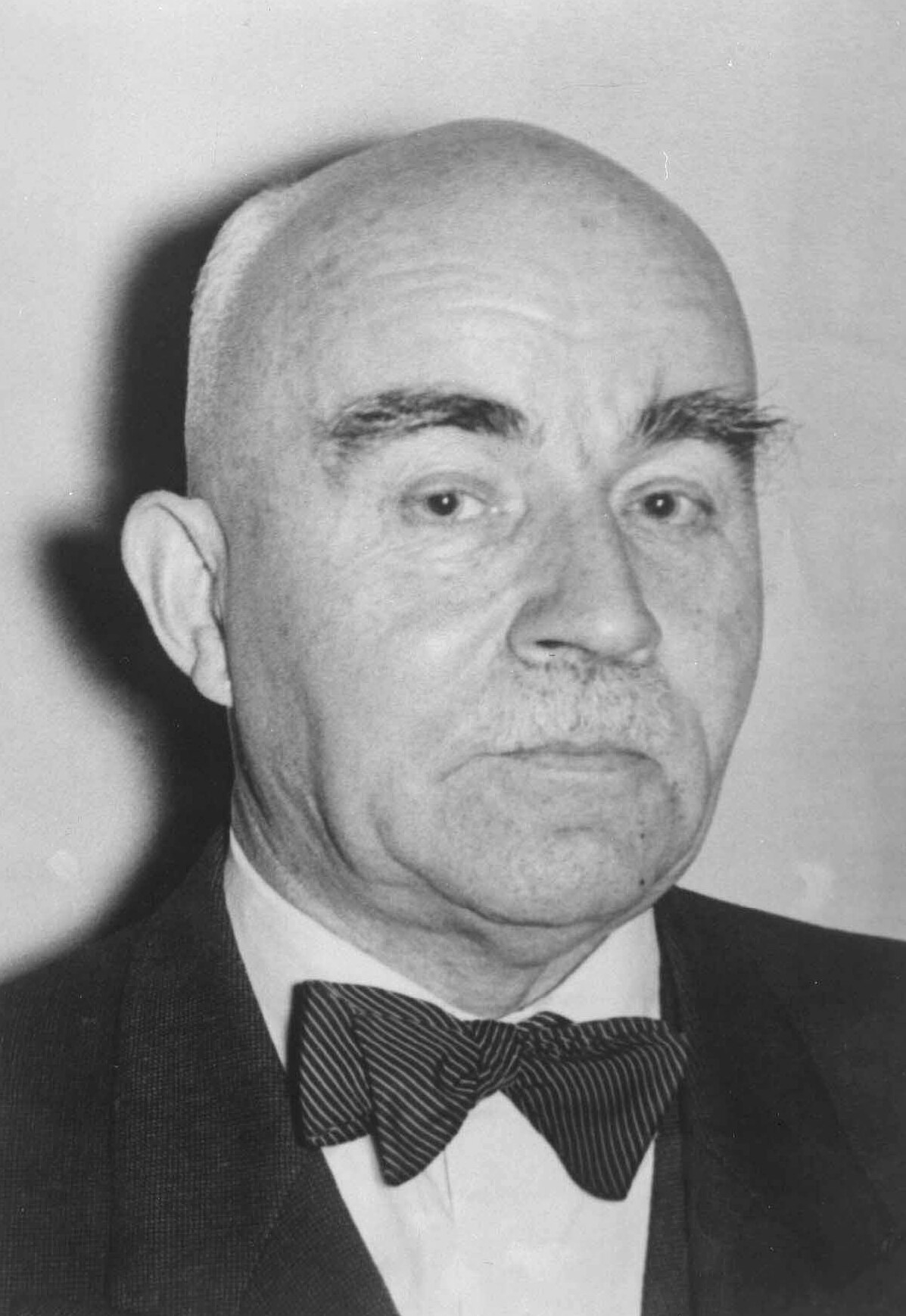
Nominee	Heinrich Lübke	Carlo Schmid	Max Becker
Party	CDU	SPD	FDP
Electoral vote	517 (1st round); 526 (2nd round)	385 (1st round); 386 (2nd round)	104 (1st round); 99 (2nd round)
Percentage	50.7%	37.2%	9.5%
Nominators	CDU/CSU, DP	SPD	FDP
President before election
Theodor Heuss
FDP
Elected President
Heinrich Lübke
CDU

An indirect presidential election (officially the 3rd Federal Convention) was held in West Germany on 1 July 1959. For the first time in the Federal Republic, the incumbent president, Theodor Heuss, was not eligible for reelection. In the buildup to the election, Chancellor Konrad Adenauer initially declared his candidacy, but then withdrew for political reasons. The Christian Democratic Union instead nominated Heinrich Lübke. The Social Democrats nominated Carlo Schmid who had been the party's caucus chair at the Parliamentary Council. The Free Democratic Party nominated the chair of its Bundestag caucus, Max Becker. Like the first contested presidential election ten years prior, it took two rounds to determine a winner. Heinrich Lübke fell two votes short of the absolute majority in the first round, winning the election with 526 votes in the second.

== Composition of the Federal Convention ==
The president is elected by the Federal Convention consisting of all the members of the Bundestag and an equal number of delegates representing the states. These are divided proportionally by population to each state, and each state's delegation is divided among the political parties represented in its parliament so as to reflect the partisan proportions in the parliament.

By party		By state	
Party	Members	State	Members
CDU/CSU	517	Bundestag	519
SPD	386	Baden-Württemberg	70
FDP	82	Bavaria	88
DP	24	Berlin	21
GB/BHE	20	Bremen	6
BP	6	Hamburg	17
DPS	3	Hesse	44
Total	1038	Lower Saxony	62
		North Rhine-Westphalia	147
		Rhineland-Palatinate	32
		Saarland	10
		Schleswig-Holstein	22
		Total	1038

Source: Eine Dokumentation aus Anlass der Wahl des Bundespräsidenten am 18. März 2012

== Results ==
Candidate	Parties	First round		Second round	
Candidate	Parties	Votes	%	Votes	%
Heinrich Lübke	CDU/CSU, DP	517	49.8	536	50.7
Carlo Schmid	SPD	385	37.1	386	37.2
Max Becker	FDP	104	10.0	99	9.5
Abstentions		25	2.4	22	2.1
Invalid votes		0	0	0	0
Not present		7	0.7	5	0.5
Total		1,031	99.3	1,033	99.5
Source: Bundestag
