= 1974 West German presidential election =

- 15 May 1974
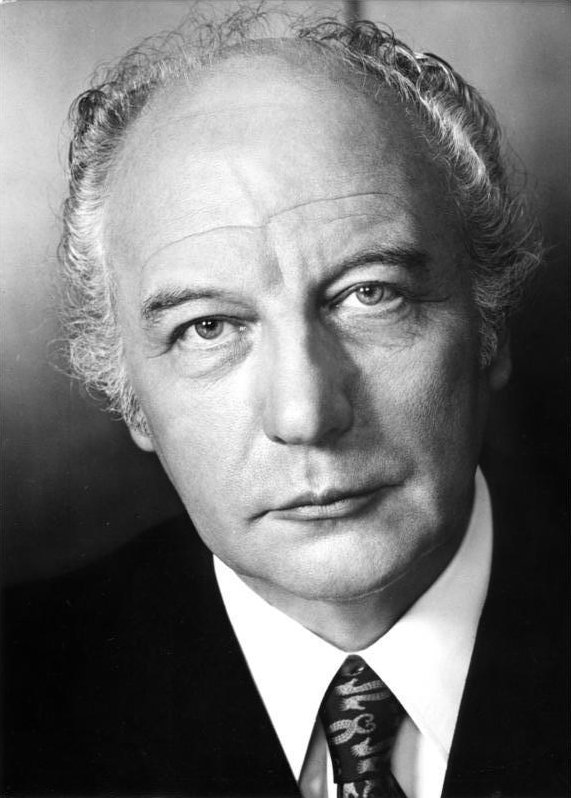

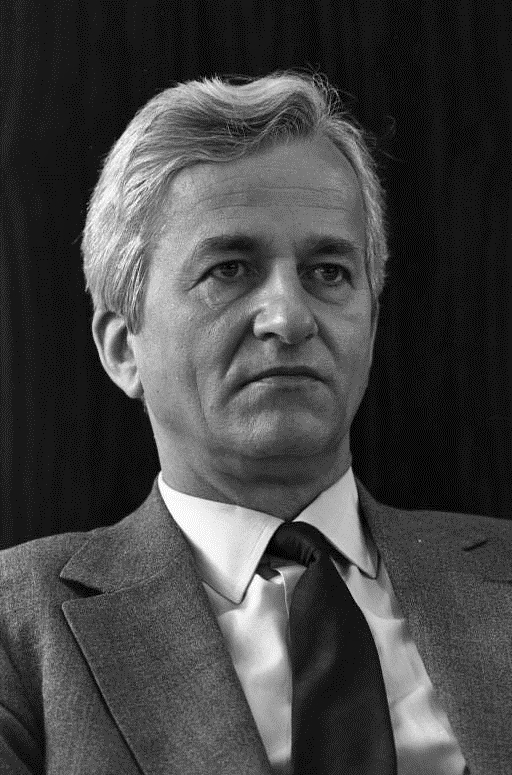
Nominee	Walter Scheel	Richard von Weizsäcker
Party	FDP	CDU
Electoral vote	530	498
Percentage	51.2%	48.1%
Nominators	FDP, SPD	CDU/CSU
President before election
Gustav Heinemann
SPD
Elected President
Walter Scheel
FDP

An indirect presidential election (officially the 6th Federal Convention) was held in West Germany on 15 May 1974. Though not term limited, incumbent Gustav Heinemann chose not to seek a second term. The government parties (SPD and FDP) nominated Vice-Chancellor Walter Scheel; the Christian Democratic Union nominated Richard von Weizsäcker. Scheel won the election by 32 votes on the first ballot. He served as president until 1979. Weizsäcker would later serve as president from 1984 to 1994.

== Composition of the Federal Convention ==
The president is elected by the Federal Convention consisting of all the members of the Bundestag and an equal number of delegates representing the states. These are divided proportionally by population to each state, and each state's delegation is divided among the political parties represented in its parliament so as to reflect the partisan proportions in the parliament.

By Party		By State	
Party	Members	State	Members
CDU/CSU	501	Bundestag	518
SPD	470	Baden-Württemberg	75
FDP	65	Bavaria	91
Total	1036	Berlin	17
		Bremen	6
		Hamburg	15
		Hesse	46
		Lower Saxony	62
		North Rhine-Westphalia	143
		Rhineland-Palatinate	33
		Saarland	10
		Schleswig-Holstein	22
		Total	1036

Source: Eine Dokumentation aus Anlass der Wahl des Bundespräsidenten am 18. März 2012

== Results ==
Candidate	Parties	Votes	%
Walter Scheel	FDP, SPD	530	51.2
Richard von Weizsäcker	CDU/CSU	498	48.1
Abstentions		5	0.5
Invalid votes		0	0.0
Not present		3	0.3
Total		1,036	100
Source: Bundestag
