= 1954 West German presidential election =

- 17 July 1954
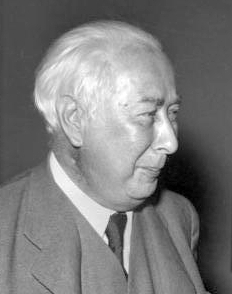

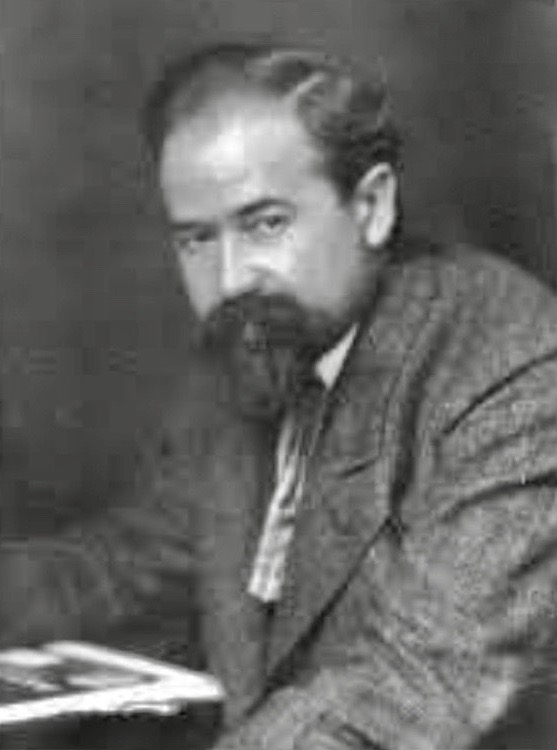
Nominee	Theodor Heuss	Alfred Weber
Party	FDP	KPD
Electoral vote	871	12
Percentage	85.6%	1.2%
Nominators	CDU/CSU, SPD, FDP, DP	KPD
President before election
Theodor Heuss
FDP
Elected President
Theodor Heuss
FDP

An indirect presidential election (officially the 2nd Federal Convention) was held in West Germany on 17 July 1954. The government parties and the opposition SPD renominated incumbent Theodor Heuss. Against his wishes, the Communist Party of Germany nominated Alfred Weber. Heuss was reelected on the first ballot with about 85% of the vote.

== Composition of the Federal Convention ==
The president is elected by the Federal Convention consisting of all the members of the Bundestag and an equal number of delegates representing the states. These are divided proportionally by population to each state, and each state's delegation is divided among the political parties represented in its parliament so as to reflect the partisan proportions in the parliament.

By party
Party	Members
CDU/CSU	431
SPD	347
FDP	112
DP	15
BP	15
Z	12
KPD	10
Hamburg-Block	9
SSW	1
DRP	1
Independents	4
Total	1018

By state
State	Members
Bundestag	509
Baden-Württemberg	68
Bavaria	91
Berlin	22
Bremen	6
Hamburg	17
Hesse	44
Lower Saxony	65
North Rhine-Westphalia	141
Rhineland-Palatinate	32
Schleswig-Holstein	23
Total	1018

== Results ==
Candidate	Parties	Votes	%
Theodor Heuss	CDU/CSU, SPD, FDP, DP	871	85.6
Alfred Weber	KPD	12	1.2
Others^{1}		6	0.6
Abstentions		95	9.3
Invalid votes		3	0.3
Not cast		31	3.0
Total		1,018	100

Note:1. In addition to the two formally nominated candidates President of the Reich Karl Dönitz, Prince Louis Ferdinand of Prussia, Marie Elisabeth Lüders, Prince Ernest Augustus of Hanover, Franz-Josef Wuermeling, and Chancellor Konrad Adenauer received one vote each.
