= Vorgrimler =

Vorgrimler is a German surname. Notable people with the surname include:

- Herbert Vorgrimler (1929–2014), German Roman Catholic theologian and writer
- Ludwig Vorgrimler (1912–1983), German firearm designer
