= Martin Honecker =

German philosopher and psychologist (1888–1941)

Martin Honecker (9 June 1888, Bonn – 20 October 1941, Freiburg im Breisgau) was a German philosopher and psychologist.

== Biography ==
The son of a businessman, he studied at the Rhenish Friedrich Wilhelm University of Bonn and the Ludwig-Maximilians-Universität München (LMU Munich), with, among others, Adolf Dyroff. In 1914, Honecker graduated with a doctorate in the legal philosophy of Alessandro Turamini. He fought in World War I, but was captured by the French and interned in Switzerland.

During his imprisonment he began his work Gegenstandslogik und Denklogik. In 1924, he took over the chair of Josef Geyser in Freiburg as a full professor.

From 1925 to 1929, he was secretary general of the Görres-Stiftung. From 1925 to 1926, he was one of the editors of the quarterly education journal Pädagogik. He also edited the philosophy journals Forschungen zur Geschichte der Philosophie der Neuzeit and Philosophische Handbibliothek. He was the doctoral advisor of Roman Catholic theologian Karl Rahner.

During World War II he worked as an Army psychologist at the Generalkommando V in Stuttgart.

== Works ==
- Die Staatsphilosophie des Sebastian Fox Morcillo, 1914
- Das Denken. Versuch einer gemeinverständlichen Gesamtdarstellung, 1925
- Synthesen in der Philosophie der Gegenwart, Festgabe Adolf Dyroff zum 60. Geburtstag. Schroeder, Bonn 1926, mit Erich Feldmann
- Logik. Eine Systematik des logischen Probleme, 1927, 1942
- Gegenstandslogik und Denklogik. Vorschlag zu einer Neugestaltung der Logik., 1928
- Die Probleme der Wertungspsychologie, in: Philosophia Perennis. Abhandlungen zu ihrer *Vergangenheit und Gegenwart. Festschrift, Josef Geyser zum 60. Geburtstag. Hrsg. von Fritz-Joachim von Rintelen, Bd. 1, Regensburg 1930
- Jahresbericht der Görres-Gesellschaft 1928/1929, 1930
- Nikolaus von Cues und die griechische Sprache, Heidelberg: Carl Winter, 1938
