= Turamini =

Turamini is a surname. Notable people with the surname include:

- Alessandro Turamini (1556–1605), Italian lawyer
- Ascanio Turamini (1586–1647), Roman Catholic prelate
