= Hugo Rahner =

German Jesuit theologian and historian (1900–1968)

Hugo Rahner SJ
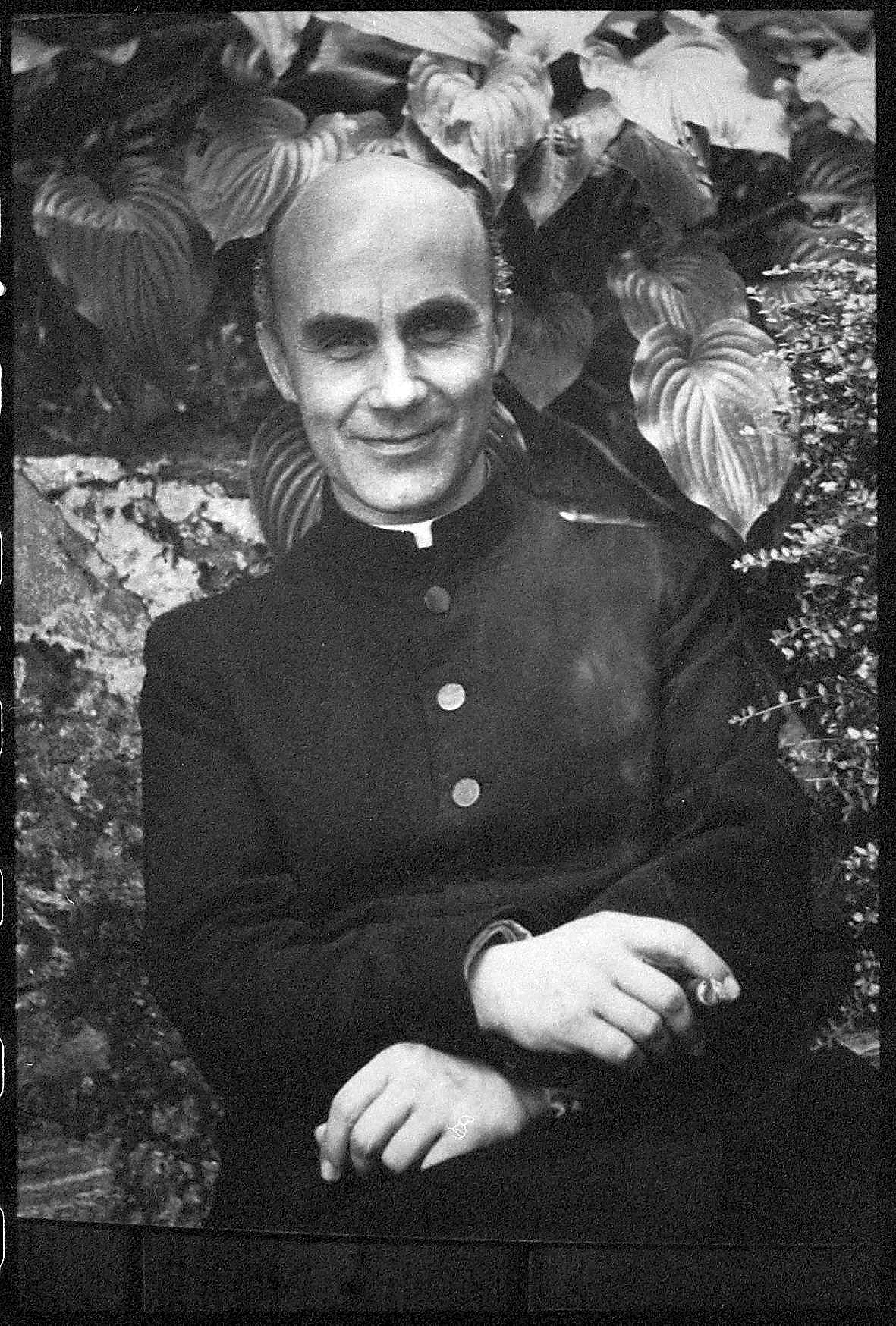
- Born: Hugo Karl Erich Rahner; 3 May 1900; Pfullendorf, Grand Duchy of Baden, German Empire
- Died: 21 December 1968 (aged 68); Munich, West Germany
- Resting place: Jesuit community cemetery
- Occupations: Jesuit priest; theologian; ecclesiastical historian
- Notable work: Mater Ecclesia – Lobpreis der Kirche aus dem ersten Jahrtausend; Griechische Mythen in christlicher Deutung; Kirche und Staat im frühen Christentum; Our Lady and the Church
- Awards: Grand Decoration of Honour in Silver for Services to the Republic of Austria (1955); Honorable chain of Tyrol (1958); Austrian Decoration for Science and Art (1959); Honorary doctorate, University of Innsbruck (1968)
- Religion: Christianity
- Denomination: Roman Catholic
- Theological work
- Era: 20th-century theology
- Language: German
- Tradition or movement: Catholic theology
- Main interests: Mariology; Patristics; Ecclesiology; Ignatian spirituality; Church–state relations

Hugo Karl Erich Rahner SJ (3 May 1900 – 21 December 1968) was a German Jesuit theologian and ecclesiastical historian. He was dean and president of the University of Innsbruck and the elder brother of the noted theologian Karl Rahner.

== Early life ==
Rahner was born in 1900 in Pfullendorf, then in the Grand Duchy of Baden, a part of the new German Empire. He entered the Jesuit Order in 1919 and was sent to Valkenburg, in the Netherlands, for theological and philosophical studies. Ordained a priest in 1929, he completed his doctorate in theology in 1931, after which he worked on a doctorate in philosophy. From 1937, he taught at the theological faculty in Innsbruck (Austria), specializing in patrology and history of Catholic dogma. The Nazis forced his resignation and exile in the years 1940–1945.

== Career ==
=== Academics ===
After the war, he was named dean and later president of the University of Innsbruck. His work focused on the relation between Church and State in the early years of Christianity. Armed with extensive documentation, Rahner tried to revive the early Christian enthusiasm for the Church. He mentions Tertullian: "GREAT is the emperor, because he is smaller than the heavens,“ and Ambrose of Milan, "It is not imperial to deny freedom of speech, it is not priestly to withhold one's opinion." All are called into the Church. The Church is called Kyriake, which means "of the Lord," because Christ the Lord is ruler. She has to teach in all centuries to all states, what Christ the Lord and ruler has wonderfully decreed to the people.

=== Theological work ===
==== Mariology ====
Hugo Rahner's great achievement was his rediscovery, in the Fathers, of the indivisibility of Mary and the Church.

— Pope Benedict XVI

Rahner's Mariology, following Ambrose of Milan, sees Mary in her role within the Church. His interpretation, based solely on the early writers, greatly influenced Vatican II's treatment of Mary in chapter VIII of the Constitution on the Church, Lumen gentium, and Pope Paul VI, quoting Ambrose, declared Mary the "Mother of the Church," a title actively promoted by Popes John Paul II and Benedict XVI. The latter specifically gives credit to Rahner in this regard.

At first sight, J. Ratzinger argues, it may seem accidental that the Council moved mariology into ecclesiology. But this relation helps to understand what "Church" really is, as Ratzinger maintains: Hugo Rahner showed that Mariology was originally ecclesiology; the Church is like Mary.

The Church is virgin and mother, she is immaculate and carries the burdens of history. She suffers and she is assumed into heaven. Slowly the Church learns that Mary is her mirror, that she is a person in Mary. Mary, on the other hand, is not an isolated individual, who rests in herself. She carries the mystery of the Church.

Pope Benedict lamented that this unity of the Church and Mary, brought to light by Rahner, was overshadowed in later centuries which overburdened Mary with privileges and removed her to a far distance. Both mariology and ecclesiology suffered from this. A Marian view of the Church and an ecclesiological view of Mary in salvation history lead directly to Christ. It brings to light what is meant by holiness and by God being human.

Only one work on mariology, Our Lady and the Church, is translated into English. The book received great praise not only from Pope Benedict XVI but also from the American Jesuit theologian Cardinal Avery Dulles, who said of it: "With engaging clarity, this pioneering study sets forth the vast range of biblical metaphors the Fathers applied to Mary and the Church: ark of the covenant, valiant woman, treasure-laden ship. This rich theology of poetry and image has much to say to our more prosaic age."

==== Ignatius of Loyola ====
Together with Otto Karrer, Rahner contributed by means of several works to a revised view of St. Ignatius of Loyola, the founder of his Order. Rahner described Ignatius as a theologian, and pointed to the significance of his letters to women. In examining the various stages of Ignatius' development, he applied critical historical method to the surviving documents rather than a hagiographical approach. In this sense Rahner's work is considered a modern turning point in research on Ignatius.

==== Views on the Early Church ====
Rahner's Greek Myths and Christian Mystery, first published in its original German in 1957, refutes the theories proposed by a number of comparative historians of his age who contended there existed a dependency within early Christianity on the mystery cults and that the early Church arose as "no more than a genetic derivative of the mystery cults". In contrast, while Rahner does acknowledge that the Church of late antiquity adopted many of its nonessential markers and ritualistic dressings from with pagan mysticism, all essential elements of the Christian mystery and the emergent Church remained untarnished by external influence and independent from conception. According to this view, the presence of Roman cults which dominated the environment in which the early Church gained its footing and eventually gained supremacy was not necessary for the Church's foundation but merely helped shape features and rites of the institution without invading or influencing Christianity's core tenets. For example, Rahner's analysis notes the centrality of celestial bodies including the Sun (Helios) and Moon (Luna)- both longstanding entities of cultic devotion- in Roman paganism and the early Church's intentional, analogous use of the Sun and Moon as symbols of Jesus Christ and Mary (or, alternatively, the Church), respectively.

== Death ==
Rahner began to suffer from Parkinson's disease in 1963, which slowly caused a change in his personality. He was sent to the Jesuit residence at Berchmans College, now the Munich School of Philosophy, in 1966. He died on 21 December 1968 in Munich and he was buried in the Jesuit community's cemetery in Pullach.

== Selected writings ==
- Our Lady and the Church;
- Eine Theologie der Verkündigung, Freiburg 1939;
- Abendländische Kirchenfreiheit, Einsiedeln/Köln 1943;
- Mater Ecclesia - Lobpreis der Kirche aus dem ersten Jahrtausend, Einsiedeln/Köln 1944;
- Mariens Himmelfahrt und das Priestertum, Innsbruck 1951;
- Der spielende Mensch, Einsiedeln 1952;
- Die Kirche - Gottes Kraft in menschlicher Schwäche, Freiburg 1956;
- Ignatius von Loyola. Geistliche Briefe, Einsiedeln/Köln 1956;
- Ignatius von Loyola. Briefwechsel mit Frauen, Freiburg 1956;
- Griechische Mythen in christlicher Deutung, Zürich 1957/Basel 1984;
- Sinn der Geschichte - Persönlichkeit und Geschichte, Kevelaer 1959;
- Himmelfahrt der Kirche, Freiburg 1961;
- Kirche und Staat im frühen Christentum, München 1951;
- Maria und die Kirche. Zehn Kapitel über das geistliche Leben, Innsbruck 1951;
- Symbole der Kirche, Salzburg 1954;
- Abendland, Freiburg 1966.

== Literature on Hugo Rahner ==
- Jean Daniélou und Herbert Vorgrimler: Sentire Ecclesiam - Das Bewußtsein von der Kirche als gestaltende Kraft der Frömmigkeit. Festschrift zum 60. Geburtstag von H. Rahner, Freiburg-Basel-Wien 1961 (inkl. Verzeichnis der Werke)
- Johannes Holdt: Hugo Rahner: sein geschichts- und symboltheologisches Denken, Paderborn 1997, ISBN 3-506-73956-5
- Abraham Peter Kustermann und Karl Heinz Neufeld (Hrsg.): Gemeinsame Arbeit im brüderlicher Liebe - Hugo und Karl Rahner. Dokumente und Würdigung ihrer Weggemeinschaft, Stuttgart 1993, ISBN 3-926297-48-4
- Karl Heinz Neufeld: Die Brüder Rahner: eine Biographie. Freiburg i. Br.; Basel; Wien: Herder 1994, ISBN 3-451-23466-1

== Decorations and awards ==
- 1955 - Grand Decoration of Honour in Silver for Services to the Republic of Austria (Grosses Silbernes Ehrenzeichen)
- 1958 - Honorable chain of Tyrol
- 1959 - Austrian Decoration for Science and Art "Pro et litteris artibus"
- 1968 - Honorary Doctorate of the University of Innsbruck
