= Virtuous pagan =

Concept in Christian theology

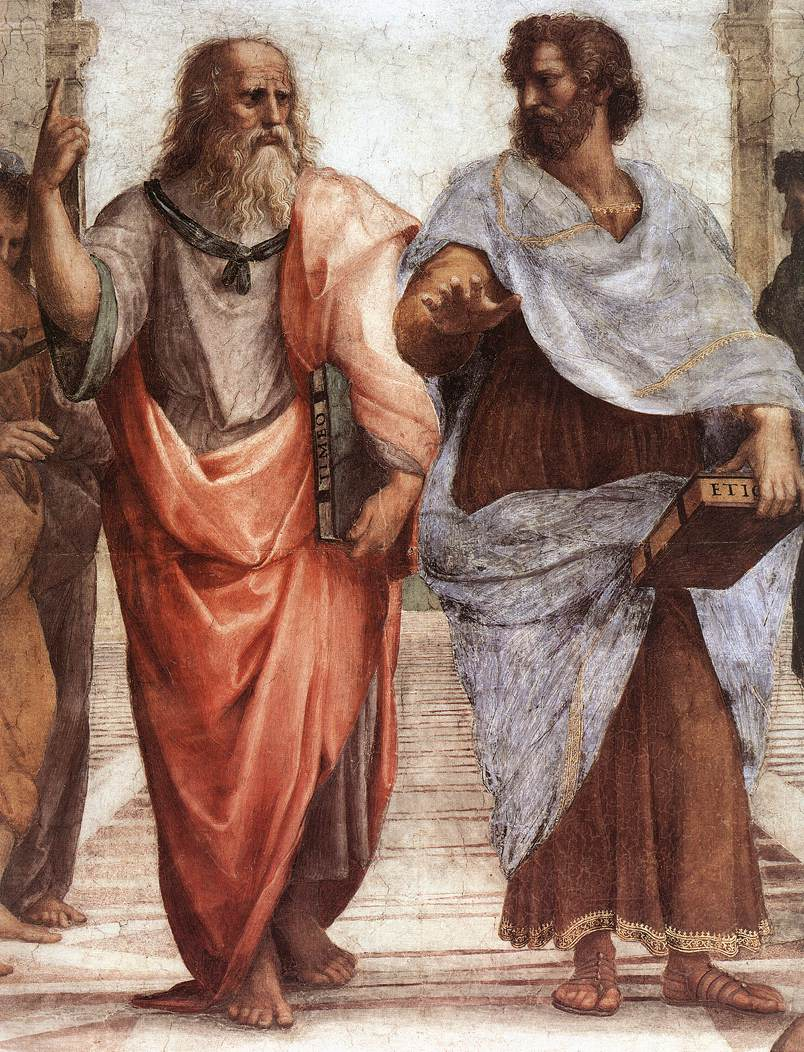
Plato and Aristotle, Fresco from The School of Athens in the Apostolic Palace, Vatican City

Virtuous pagan is a concept in Christian theology addressing the fate of the unlearned—the issue of nonbelievers who were never evangelized and consequently during their lifetime had no opportunity to recognize Christ, but nevertheless led virtuous lives, so that it seemed objectionable to consider them damned. Prominent examples of virtuous pagans are Heraclitus, Parmenides, Socrates, Plato, Aristotle, Cicero, Trajan, and Virgil.

A Christian doctrinal formulation of this concept, though not universally accepted, is known as the "Anonymous Christian" in the theology of Karl Rahner, which is analogous to teachings of the gerim toshavim in Judaism and Hanifs in Islam.

== Biblical and theological foundations ==
In the Bible, Paul the Apostle teaches that the conscience of the pagan will be judged even though they cannot possess the law of God. Paul writes:

^{12} For as many as have sinned without law shall also perish without law: and as many as have sinned in the law shall be judged by the law; ^{13} (For not the hearers of the law are just before God, but the doers of the law shall be justified. ^{14} For when the Gentiles, which have not the law, do by nature the things contained in the law, these, having not the law, are a law unto themselves: ^{15} Which shew the work of the law written in their hearts, their conscience also bearing witness, and their thoughts the mean while accusing or else excusing one another;) ^{16} In the day when God shall judge the secrets of men by Jesus Christ according to my gospel. Romans 2:12–16

Certain Church Fathers, while encouraging evangelism of nonbelievers, are known to have taken a more broadly inclusive view as to the participation of non-Christians in divine wisdom. In Chapter 46 of his First Apology, Justin Martyr went so far as to claim all logos-inspired pagans as sharing in the wisdom of God, even those who espoused nontheistic philosophies:

We have been taught that Christ is the First-born of God, and we have suggested above that He is the logos of whom every race of men and women were partakers. And they who lived with the logos are Christians, even though they have been thought atheists; as, among the Greeks, Socrates and Heraclitus, and people like them."

Francis A. Sullivan believes that early Christian writers "did not preclude virtuous pagans from possibly attaining salvation", but he "agrees that it is possible that the patristic Fathers, had they been asked directly, may have denied that pagans and Jews could become partakers of eternal life."

== In literature and culture ==
Dante Alighieri, in his Divine Comedy, places a number of virtuous pagans in the first circle of Hell (analogous to Limbo), including Homer, Horace, Ovid, and Lucan. Intriguingly, the Muslim champion Saladin is also counted among the ranks of virtuous non-Christians due to his reputation for chivalry, despite the prevalent view among Christians that Muslims were schismatic adherents of a heretical Christology; whereas Muhammad himself was consigned to the ninth ditch of the eighth circle of hell, reserved for schismatics. Meanwhile, Dante placed the pagan emperor Trajan in Paradise and Cato the Younger, a suicide, with Statius in Purgatory, while Virgil, whose poetry was thought to prophesy the Christian epoch, he consigned to Limbo. It is clear that these portrayals reflect Dante's impressionistic assessments of each figure's true character rather than the application of doctrinal rigor to their cases.

"Virtuous paganism" became relevant to Romanticism with its interest in North European mythology or enthusiasm for the rediscovered pagan ethos of the Icelandic sagas. Tom Shippey argues that the fiction of J. R. R. Tolkien is significantly based on such a concept of virtuous paganism:

Tolkien was "rather disturbed by [an Armageddon which the wrong side wins (Ragnarök)]: he saw that the ethos it represented could be used by either side, as indeed it was in the deliberate cultivation of Götterdämmerung by the Nazi leadership a few years later. Nevertheless it did provide an image of heroic virtue which could exist, and could be admired, outside the Christian framework. In some respects (as you can see in his 1936 Beowulf lecture, see Essays, 24–25) the Old Norse 'theory of courage' might even be regarded as ethically superior to the Classical if not to the Christian world-view, in that it demanded commitment to virtue without any offer of lasting reward. ... He also felt that Old Norse mythology provided a model for what one might call 'virtuous paganism,' which was heathen; conscious of its own inadequacy, and so ripe for conversion; but not yet sunk into despair and disillusionment like so much of 20th-century post-Christian literature; a mythology which was in its way light-hearted."

== See also ==
- Christianity and Paganism
- Crypto-paganism § In the Middle Ages
- Danel
- Fate of the unlearned
- Hanif
- Nine Worthies
- Noble savage
- Righteous Among the Nations
- Urmonotheismus
