= 1984 West German presidential election =

- 23 May 1984
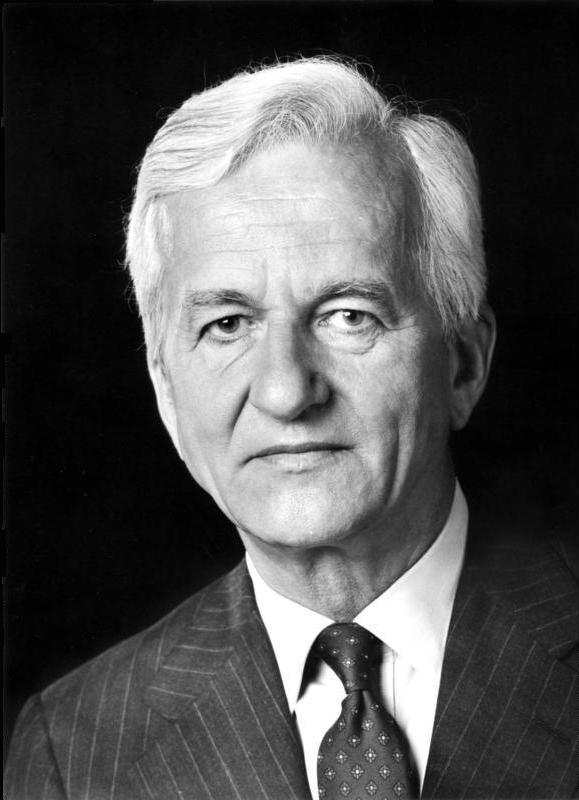

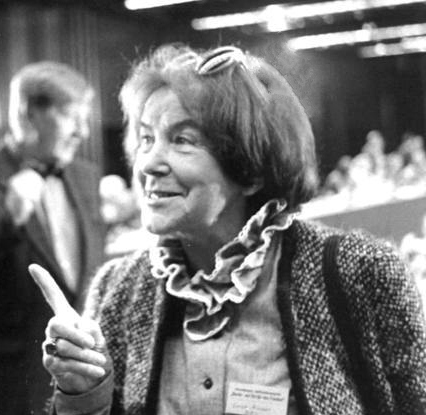
Nominee	Richard von Weizsäcker	Luise Rinser
Party	CDU	Greens
Electoral vote	832	68
Percentage	80%	6.5%
Nominators	CDU/CSU, SPD, FDP	The Greens
President before election
Karl Carstens
CDU
Elected President
Richard von Weizsäcker
CDU

An indirect presidential election (officially the 8th Federal Convention) was held in West Germany on 23 May 1984. Though not term limited, incumbent Karl Carstens elected not to seek a second term. His Christian Democratic Union instead nominated Richard von Weizsäcker, the governing mayor of West Berlin. The Greens, who were represented at the Federal Convention for the first time, nominated author Luise Rinser. The SPD and FDP elected not to nominate candidates. Weizsäcker won the election with 80% of the vote on the first ballot.

== Composition of the Federal Convention ==
The president is elected by the Federal Convention consisting of all the members of the Bundestag and an equal number of delegates representing the states. These are divided proportionally by population to each state, and each state's delegation is elected by the state parliament by proportional representation.

By party		By state	
Party	Members	State	Members
CDU/CSU	525	Bundestag	520
SPD	426	Baden-Württemberg	77
FDP	47	Bavaria	94
Greens	39	Berlin	15
Independents	3	Bremen	6
Total	1040	Hamburg	13
		Hesse	46
		Lower Saxony	64
		North Rhine-Westphalia	141
		Rhineland-Palatinate	32
		Saarland	9
		Schleswig-Holstein	23
		Total	1040

Source: Eine Dokumentation aus Anlass der Wahl des Bundespräsidenten am 18. März 2012

== Results ==
Candidate	Parties	Votes	%
Richard von Weizsäcker	CDU, CSU, SPD, FDP	832	80.0
Luise Rinser	The Greens	68	6.5
Abstentions		117	11.3
Invalid		11	1.1
Not present		12	1.2
Total		1,040	100
Source: Bundestag
