= Anonymous Christian =

Theological Christian opinion

Anonymous Christian is a theological opinion concerning the fate of the unlearned which was introduced by the Jesuit theologian Karl Rahner (1904–1984) that declares that all individuals, who sincerely seek truth and goodness, and strive to follow the moral truths they know, can respond positively to God's grace, albeit unknowingly or indirectly, even if they do so through other religious traditions and/or are not explicitly aware of Jesus Christ. In other words, God's grace, including the benefits of Christ's sacrifice, are not confined to the boundaries of any particular religious tradition or by our awareness or acceptance of Christian doctrine. Instead, anyone who lives a life of love and goodness, guided by the moral teachings found in Christianity, even if they do not consciously identify with it, is implicitly united with Christ and can be saved through him, implying that non-Christians can still be recipients of God's grace and attain salvation.

Non-Christians could have "in [their] basic orientation and fundamental decision," Rahner wrote, "accepted the salvific grace of God, through Christ, although [they] may never have heard of the Christian revelation."

The notion of inclusivism, for which Rahner's Anonymous Christian is the principal Christian model, is "perhaps the most popular of interreligious postures" and was one of the most influential theological ideals to affect the Second Vatican Council.

== Karl Rahner ==
Karl Rahner accepted the notion that without Christ it was impossible to achieve salvation, but he could not accept the notion that people who have never heard of Jesus would be condemned.

"Anonymous Christianity" means that a person lives in the grace of God and attains salvation outside of explicitly constituted Christianity. A Protestant Christian is, of course, "no anonymous Christian"; that is perfectly clear. But, let us say, a Buddhist monk (or anyone else I might suppose) who, because he follows his conscience, attains salvation and lives in the grace of God; of him I must say that he is an anonymous Christian; if not, I would have to presuppose that there is a genuine path to salvation that really attains that goal, but that simply has nothing to do with Jesus Christ. But I cannot do that. And so if I hold if everyone depends upon Jesus Christ for salvation, and if at the same time I hold that many live in the world who have not expressly recognized Jesus Christ, then there remains in my opinion nothing else but to take up this postulate of an anonymous Christianity.

Rahner acknowledges the sinful state of humanity and emphasizes that salvation is not something humanity deserves but is freely given by God's grace. Rahner's view can therefore be compatible with the Protestant principles of "sola gratia" ("by grace alone"), "sola fide" ("through faith alone"), and "solus Christus" ("in Christ alone"), as he affirms that Jesus Christ is the unique and definitive mediator between God and humanity, and that it is only through His life, death, and resurrection that salvation is made possible. Rahner asserts that the grace obtained through his sacrifice is universally available to all people, so that even those who are not explicitly Christian can benefit from his saving work and be saved through their implicit faith in him.

According to Rahner, a person could "intellectually profess disbelief but [be] existentially ... committed to those values which for the Christian are concretized in God." Rahner suggests that God's grace is at work in the lives and hearts of all people, drawing them to himself, prompting them to turn away from wrongdoing, transforming them from within, and offering opportunities to lead them toward salvation, even if they are not consciously aware of it. Individuals who also do not profess belief in Jesus, even if the Gospel has been presented to them, may also be included in the scope of Jesus' salvific work due to their responding positively to God's grace through their moral and spiritual striving which serves as evidence of God's work in their lives. The ultimate determinant of salvation in this view, is one's response to God's grace which enables individuals to respond positively to these impulses/promptings of the Holy Spirit and attain salvation.

== Justifications ==
=== Cited texts ===
The theologians W. D. Davies and Dale Allison wrote that proponents of the notion find scriptural support in Romans 2:14–16, as well as in Matthew 25:31–46. (Note: Davies and Allison wrote: Rather did he hold the position stated in the Apocalypse of Sedrach: 'there are nations which have no law, yet fulfill the law; they are not baptized, but my divine Spirit enters them and they are converted to my baptism, and I receive them with my righteous ones in the bosom of Abraham. [There were rabbis who taught that righteous heathen would be saved: t. Sanh. 13.2; b. Sanh. 105a. Recall also Paul's thoughts in Rom 2.14-16: Gentiles who do the law written on their hearts may have good consciences on the last day.] The context, however, does not explicitly teach two judgements; and we are not persuaded that 'the least' are to be identified with Christians (see below). Further, we have little doubt before Matthew, the scene concerned all humanity. At the same time, 25.31-46 may very well imply that Matthew thought salvation possible for those outside the church. We are reminded of Karl Rahner's so-called 'anonymous Christian'.)

(Indeed, when Gentiles, who do not have the law, do by nature things required by the law, they are a law for themselves, even though they do not have the law. They show that the requirements of the law are written on their hearts, their consciences also bearing witness, and their thoughts sometimes accusing them and at other times even defending them.) This will take place on the day when God judges people’s secrets through Jesus Christ, as my gospel declares.

— Romans 2:14–16

In Romans 2:14-16, Paul acknowledges that Gentiles who do not have the law may still do what the law requires by obeying their conscience. This suggests that there may be some sincere seekers of truth among the Gentiles who, despite not having the law, still strive to live morally upright lives. According to this interpretation, God is the righteous judge who knows the hearts of all people and thus his judgment will take into account the individual's response to the truth they have been given, as well as their sincerity in seeking him. God will judge them based on the knowledge they have been given, not the knowledge they haven't yet received. In contrast, the Gentiles who knowingly reject the truth about God despite having some knowledge of him through creation and conscience, and choose to suppress it through their own wickedness by turning to idolatry or immorality (Romans 1:18-25) have closed themselves off of the possibility of salvation due to their persistent rejection of the truth and God.

“When the Son of Man comes in his glory, and all the angels with him, he will sit on his glorious throne. All the nations will be gathered before him, and he will separate the people one from another as a shepherd separates the sheep from the goats. He will put the sheep on his right and the goats on his left.

“Then the King will say to those on his right, ‘Come, you who are blessed by my Father; take your inheritance, the kingdom prepared for you since the creation of the world. For I was hungry and you gave me something to eat, I was thirsty and you gave me something to drink, I was a stranger and you invited me in, I needed clothes and you clothed me, I was sick and you looked after me, I was in prison and you came to visit me.’

“Then the righteous will answer him, ‘Lord, when did we see you hungry and feed you, or thirsty and give you something to drink? When did we see you a stranger and invite you in, or needing clothes and clothe you? When did we see you sick or in prison and go to visit you?’

“The King will reply, ‘Truly I tell you, whatever you did for one of the least of these brothers and sisters of mine, you did for me.’

“Then he will say to those on his left, ‘Depart from me, you who are cursed, into the eternal fire prepared for the devil and his angels. For I was hungry and you gave me nothing to eat, I was thirsty and you gave me nothing to drink, I was a stranger and you did not invite me in, I needed clothes and you did not clothe me, I was sick and in prison and you did not look after me.’

“They also will answer, ‘Lord, when did we see you hungry or thirsty or a stranger or needing clothes or sick or in prison, and did not help you?’

“He will reply, ‘Truly I tell you, whatever you did not do for one of the least of these, you did not do for me.’

“Then they will go away to eternal punishment, but the righteous to eternal life.”

— Matthew 25:31–46

Proponents of this view often argue that in the parable, the sheep (the righteous) are separated from the goats (the unrighteous) on the basis of how they have treated others during their earthly lives. The righteous are commended for their acts of compassion and care for the needy, while the unrighteous are condemned for their failure to do so. Jesus identifies himself with the needy, saying, "Truly I tell you, whatever you did for one of the least of these brothers and sisters of mine, you did for me." This suggests that acts of kindness and compassion towards others are ultimately acts of service to Christ himself, suggesting that non-Christians who also serve others, even unknowingly, are serving Christ and responding to his grace.

Some proponents may also point to other verses like:

- John 1:9 "The true light that gives light to everyone was coming into the world."
- John 12:47 "If anyone hears my words but does not keep them, I do not judge that person. For I did not come to judge the world, but to save the world."
- Acts 17:27-28 "God did this so that they would seek him and perhaps reach out for him and find him, though he is not far from any one of us. ‘For in him we live and move and have our being.’ As some of your own poets have said, ‘We are his offspring.’"
- 1 Timothy 2:3-4 "This is good, and pleases God our Savior, who wants all people to be saved and to come to a knowledge of the truth."

== Criticism ==
The Anonymous Christian theory has been criticized from a variety of viewpoints. In 2016, Pope emeritus Benedict XVI described the theory as "fascinating" but claimed that "it reduces Christianity itself to a pure conscious presentation of what a human being is in himself and therefore overlooks the drama of change and renewal that is central to Christianity." Benedict additionally criticized the theory's perennialist and universalist elements, favoring "the critique of religion of the kind exercised in the Old Testament, in the New Testament and in the early Church."

Some Catholic groups, such as the Society of St. Pius X, have long battled against the rise of liberalism and modernism in the Catholic Church and have criticized the Anonymous Christian theory saying, "is a very grave doctrinal error because it declares personal justification as being already realized for every man without any participation of his will or free choice and, so, without any need of his conversion, faith, baptism or works. Redemption is guaranteed to all, as if sanctifying grace were ontologically present in each man just because he is man."

Conservative Protestant Christians generally believe that the notion of Anonymous Christian explicitly contradicts the teachings of Saint Peter, Paul the Apostle, and other apostles. For example, Acts 4:12, "there is salvation in no one else; for there is no other name under heaven that has been given among men, by which we must be saved." This group of Christians believes in "Christian exclusivism—the view that biblical Christianity is true, and that other religious systems are false."

Some liberal Christians criticized the notion because, as Rev. Hans Küng put it, "It would be impossible to find anywhere in the world a sincere Jew, Muslim or atheist who would not regard the assertion that he is an 'anonymous Christian' as presumptuous". Religious pluralist John Hick states that this notion is paternalistic because it is "honorary status granted unilaterally to people who have not expressed any desire for it." Küng further stated that the Anonymous Christian theory is a 'theological fabrication' that merely gives face-saving lip-service to the Catholic dogma Extra Ecclesiam nulla salus. It is, says Küng sarcastically, "an elegant gesture which sweeps the whole of good-willed humanity into the backdoor of the holy Roman Church." Hick also rejects the notion because the majority of people are born into non-Christian families. Anonymous Christianity, per this group, denigrates the beliefs of others by supposing that they are really Christians without realizing it.

== See also ==
- Baptism of desire
- Substitutionary atonement
- Satisfaction theory of atonement
- Christian universalism
- History of Christian universalism
- Apocatastasis
- Virtuous pagan
- Extra Ecclesiam nulla salus § Protestant interpretation
- Similar concepts in Judaism are described at Jews as the chosen people § Alternative views
