= Paganism in Middle-earth =

Theme in Tolkien's fiction

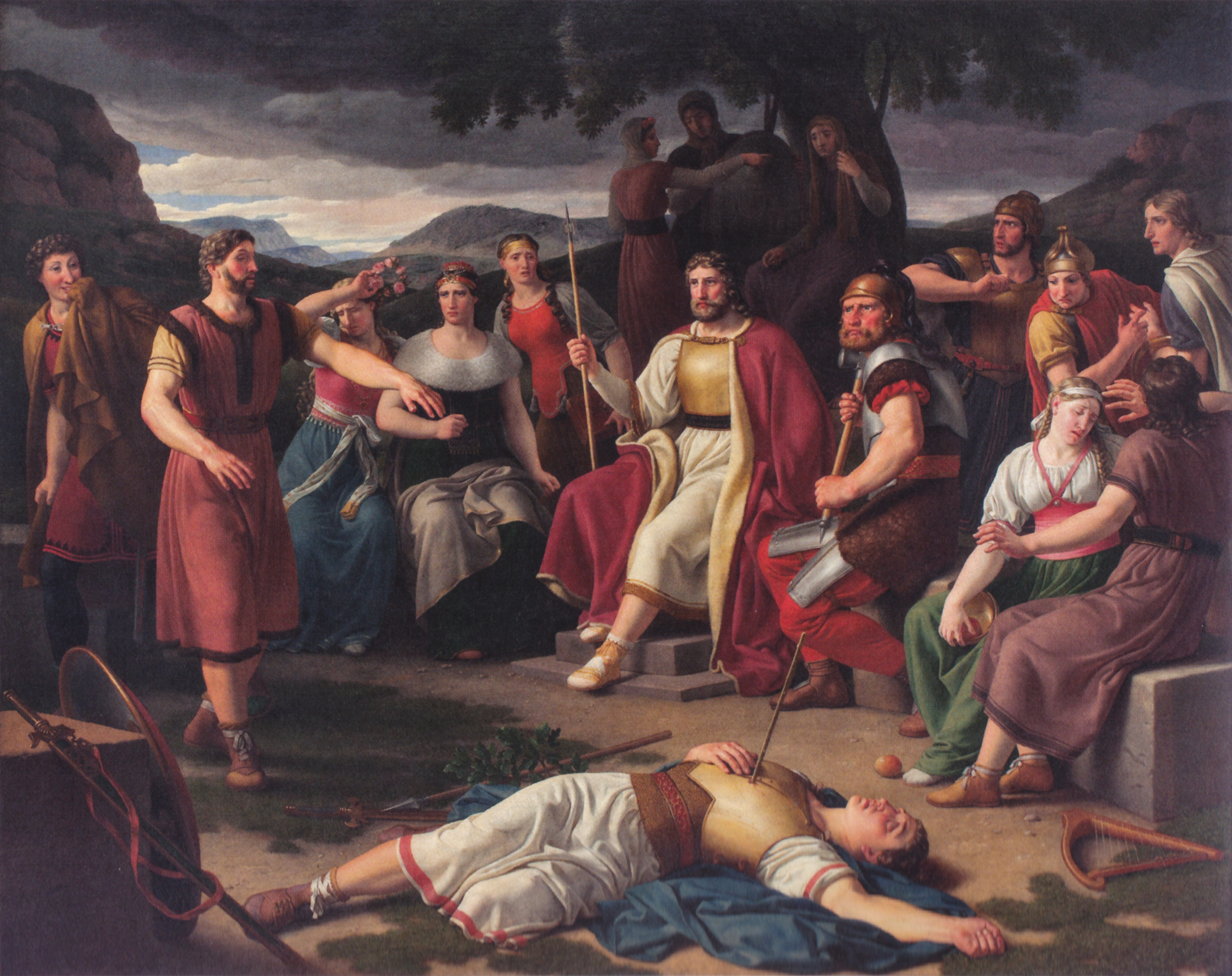
Pagan pantheon: the Valar, rulers of Middle-earth, resemble the Æsir, the strong and combative Norse gods of Asgard. Painting by Christoffer Wilhelm Eckersberg, 1817

Scholars have identified numerous themes in J. R. R. Tolkien's Middle-earth writings, among them paganism. Despite Tolkien's assertion that The Lord of the Rings was a fundamentally Christian work, paganism appears in that book and elsewhere in his fictional world of Middle-earth in multiple ways. These include a pantheon of god-like beings, the Valar, who function like the Norse gods, the Æsir; the person of the wizard Gandalf, who Tolkien stated in a letter is an "Odinic wanderer"; Elbereth, the Elves' "Queen of the Stars", associated with Venus; animism, the way that the natural world seems to be alive; and a Beowulf-like "northern courage" which is determined to press on, no matter how bleak the outlook.

Tolkien was a Christian interested in religion, and placed many hints of Christianity in The Lord of the Rings, but given that Middle-earth is the Earth in the distant past, long before the time of Christ, he could not make his characters Christian, even the most virtuous pagans among them. He was in addition a philologist, a scholar of Old English language and literature, especially of Beowulf, and he made extensive use of that poem in his Middle-earth writings.

== Context ==
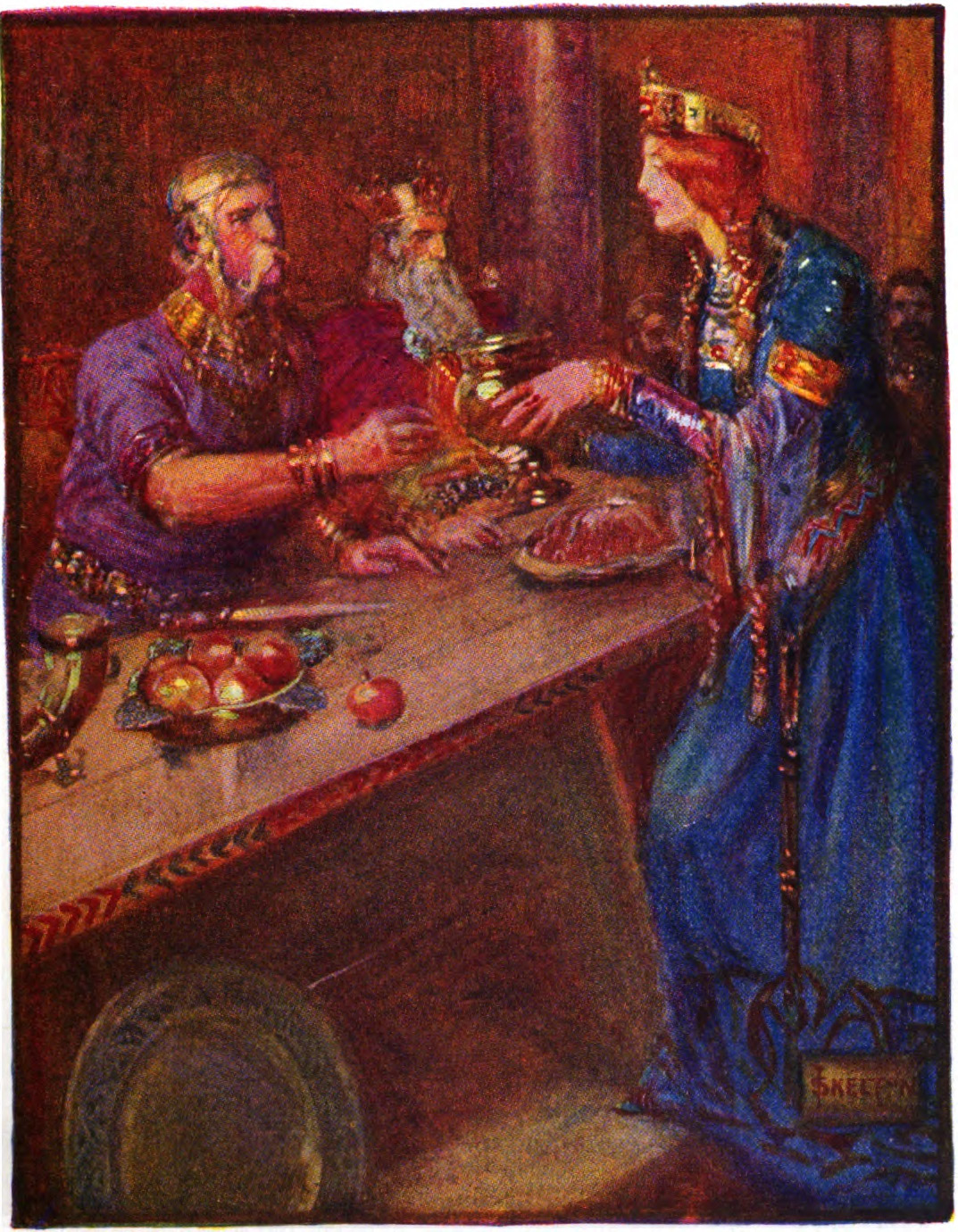
Tolkien was an expert in Anglo-Saxon literature, especially Beowulf, which like The Lord of the Rings is about a pagan world told by a Christian narrator. 1908 illustration by J. R. Skelton.

Paganism covers an eclectic mix of religious beliefs and practices, often including many gods (polytheism) and a living nature imbued with spirit (animism). It was defined in early Christian times largely negatively, as non-Christian religion. Pagans may speak as if there was just one deity, often "the Goddess", while accepting multiple deities; they may speak of nature or the Earth as divine, suggesting a form of pantheism, though this may shade into either animism or transcendentalism. There is thus a wide spectrum of belief.

J. R. R. Tolkien was a devout Roman Catholic. He described The Lord of the Rings as "fundamentally" Christian, and there are many Christian themes in that work. He wrote in a letter to his close friend and Jesuit priest, Robert Murray: (Note: Carpenter 2023, Letters #142 to Robert Murray, S.J., 2 December 1953)

The Lord of the Rings is of course a fundamentally religious and Catholic work; unconsciously so at first, but consciously in the revision. That is why I have not put in, or have cut out, practically all references to anything like 'religion', to cults or practices, in the imaginary world. For the religious element is absorbed into the story and the symbolism.

The scholar Patrick Curry writes that Tolkien's statement elides the paganism that pervades the work, and indeed the whole of his Middle-earth Legendarium; it may be fundamentally Christian, but on other levels it is another matter, with its pagan polytheism and animism, and many other features. In other words, Middle-earth is both Christian and pagan. Pat Reynolds of the Tolkien Society writes that the Catholic Tolkien was familiar with multiple systems of belief, something that did not in his view imply that Tolkien was "a closet pagan". Reynolds adds that, on the contrary, Tolkien stated explicitly in a letter that The Lord of the Rings "is built on or out of certain 'religious' [Catholic] ideas, but is not an allegory of them ... and does not mention them overtly". (Note: Carpenter 2023, Letters #211 to Rhona Beare, 14 October 1958) The Episcopal priest and theologian Fleming Rutledge adds that Middle-earth deliberately appears as "a curiously nonreligious world", since Tolkien wanted to avoid any hint of pantheism, pagan worship of the natural world.

Professionally, Tolkien was a scholar of English literature, a philologist and medievalist interested in language and poetry from the Middle Ages, especially that of Anglo-Saxon England and Northern Europe. His professional knowledge of Beowulf, telling of a pagan world but with a Christian narrator, helped to shape his fictional world of Middle-earth. His intention to create what has been called "a mythology for England" (Note: Carpenter 2023, Letters #131 to Milton Waldman, late 1951) led him to construct not only stories but a fully-formed world with languages, peoples, cultures, and history, based on medieval materials.

== Multiple gods ==
=== Pantheon ===
Middle-earth is part of the created world, Eä, ruled by "the One" god, Eru Iluvatar, who in Tolkien's words "remains remote, outside the World", (Note: Carpenter 2023, Letters #181 draft to Michael Straight, probably January or February 1956) making it in principle monotheistic and thus compatible with Christianity. In practice, Middle-earth is ruled by a pantheon-like group of “angelic-beings”, the Valar, who function, as Tolkien stated, with "the imaginative but not the theological place of 'gods'". (Note: Carpenter 2023, Letters #212 unsent draft to Rhona Beare, October 1958) They are, further, related to the four ancient elements of fire, earth, air, and water in a characteristically pagan way. This makes Middle-earth appear polytheistic. Among the resemblances are the strong Oromë who fights the monsters of Melkor, recalling the powerful Norse god Thor.

The Tolkien scholar Patrick Curry writes that The Lord of the Rings "transcends any strictly monotheistic reading". Instead, he states, it displays "an extraordinary ethico-religious richness and complexity which derives from the blending (his emphasis) of Christian, pagan, and humanist ingredients".

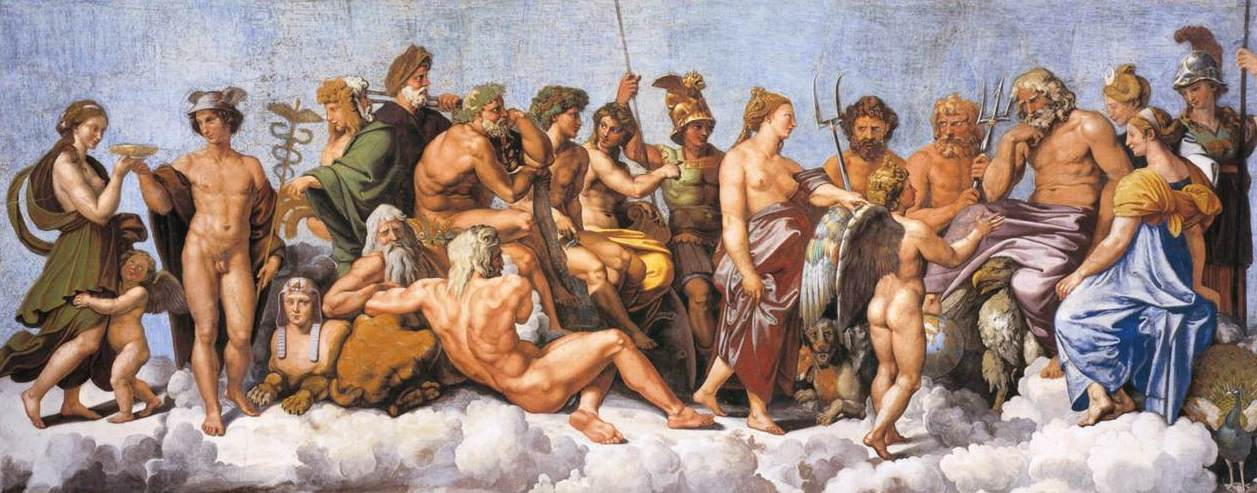
Like the pantheon of Greek gods, Tolkien's Valar behave as a group, making Middle-earth appear polytheistic.

=== Odin the wanderer ===
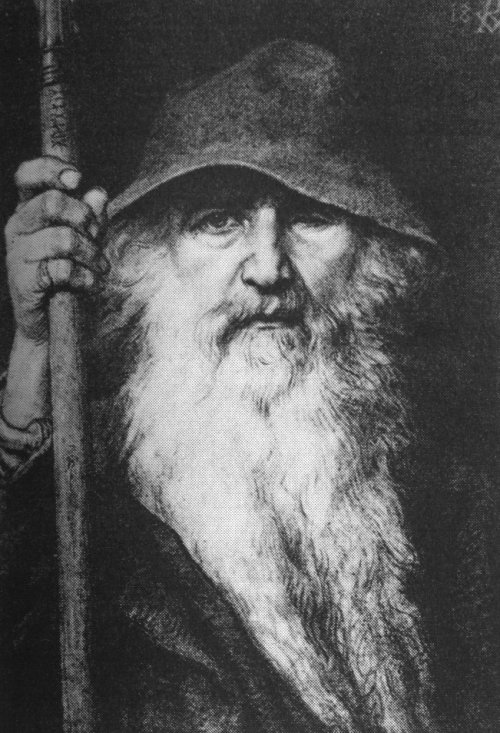
The Gandalf-like figure of the pagan god Odin, the Wanderer. Painting by Georg von Rosen, 1886

Gandalf the Wizard constantly wanders Middle-earth, wearing a traveller's battered cloak and hat; and indeed, Tolkien stated in a 1946 letter that he thought of Gandalf as an "Odinic wanderer". (Note: Carpenter 2023, Letters #107 to Stanley Unwin, 7 December 1946) Other commentators have similarly compared Gandalf to the Norse god Odin in his "Wanderer" guise—an old man with one eye, a long white beard, a wide brimmed hat, and a staff.

Although never described as a god, it is evident that Gandalf has power; Tolkien explains that the Wizards are Maiar, lesser spirits who serve the Valar, and who may take human form when in Middle-earth. In several ways he thus resembles Odin the wanderer.

=== Queen of the heavens ===
Elbereth, the Elves' "Queen of the Stars", Varda the "Lofty", is linked with Eärendil's star, which Tolkien makes clear is the Morning and Evening Star, in other words, Venus. Curry notes that the planet has since ancient times been associated with the goddess, called Aphrodite by the Greeks, Venus by the Romans. This does not necessarily imply pagan origins; Elbereth has been likened to the Virgin Mary; for instance, the Tolkien scholars Marjorie Burns and Stratford Caldecott see in the Sindarin hymn "A Elbereth Gilthoniel" an echo of John Lingard's Marian hymn, Hail Queen of Heaven, the Ocean Star, alluding to Mary as the Queen of Heaven. Curry argues on the other hand that Mary and Elbereth share antecedents in Venus, the pagan Queen of the Heavens. He writes that any Elf would find the Roman poet Lucretius's words of praise for Venus entirely suitable as praise for Elbereth: "Thou alone, O goddess, rulest over the totality of nature; without thee nothing comes to the heavenly shores of light, nothing is joyful, nothing lovable."

=== Celebrimbor and the Rings of Power ===
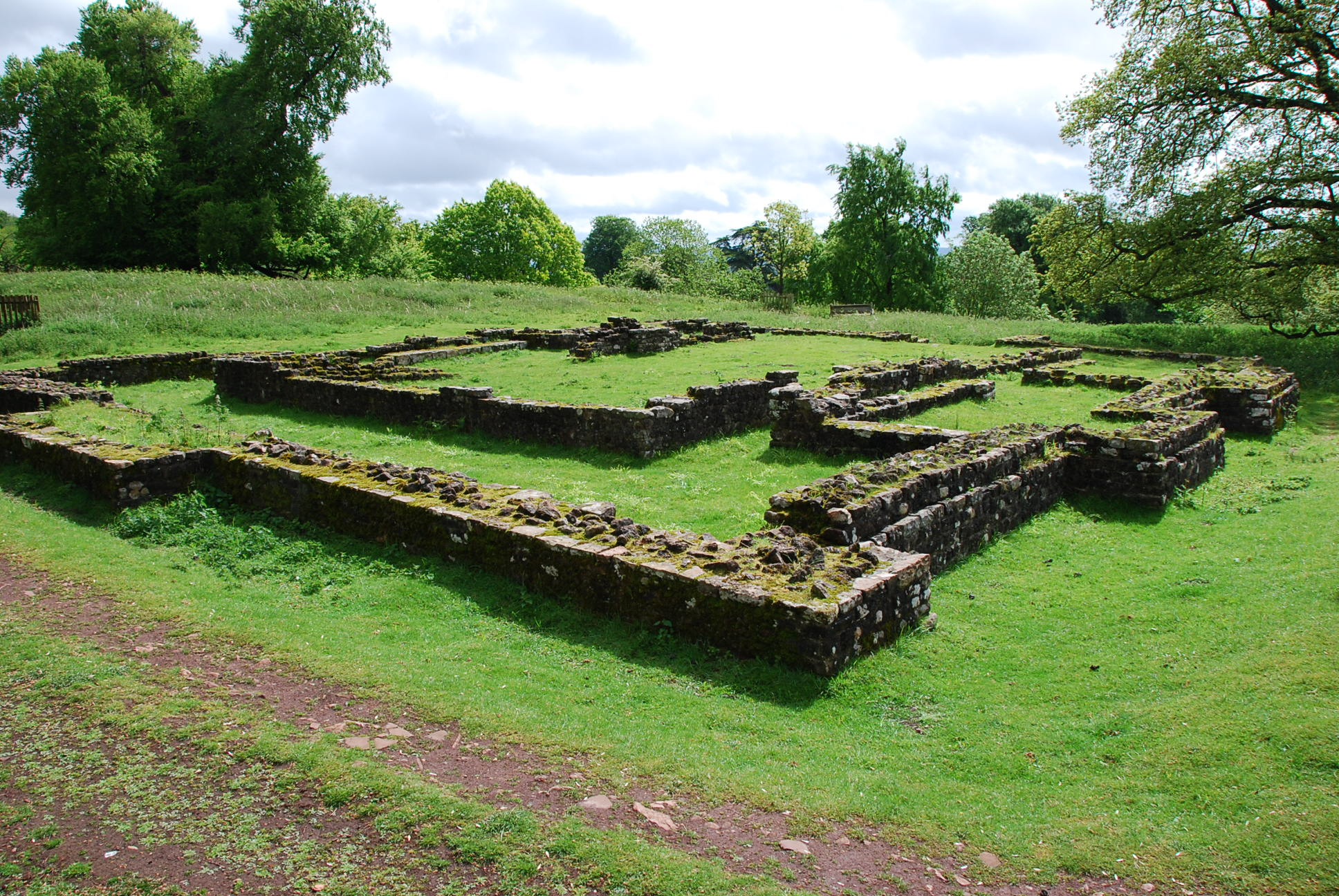
Tolkien investigated an inscription with a curse upon a ring at the temple of the pagan god Nodens. It may have inspired him to create the Elven-smith Celebrimbor "Silver-Hand" who forged Rings of Power.

In Tolkien's legendarium, the Elven-smith Celebrimbor forges Rings of Power, with consequences told in The Lord of the Rings. Tolkien had been asked to investigate a Latin inscription excavated at a 4th-century temple of the pagan god Nodens with a curse upon a ring. He concluded that Nodens was probably the origin of the Irish hero Nuada Airgetlám, "Nuada of the Silver-Hand". In the Elvish language of Sindarin, Celebrimbor similarly means "Silver-Hand". Paganism, lightly disguised, thus extends to central plot elements of Middle-earth.

== Animism ==
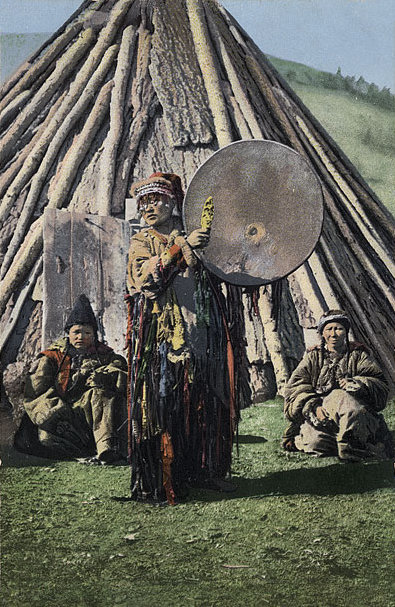
Radagast has been compared to a shaman. Altai shaman pictured.

Along with polytheism, animism, the belief that animals, plants and other objects are imbued with spirit, is a clear marker of paganism. The natural world is in many places shown to be alive, with trees that have "feet", mountains that can show their anger with snowstorms, the herb athelas that creates a sparkling joy, or the cockerel that crows to welcome the morning as the wind and weather indicate the changing tide of the Battle of the Pelennor Fields. Or again, after the battle "a great rain came out of the Sea, and it seemed that all things wept" for those killed.

Tolkien illustrates animism in a far more domestic context, too, back in the Hobbits' homeland. After the Scouring of the Shire, there was "wonderful sunshine and delicious rain ... but there seemed something more: an air of richness and growth, and a gleam of a beauty beyond that of mortal summers that flicker and pass upon this Middle-earth". Curry writes that the cosmology of Middle-earth is "polytheist-cum-animist ... natural magic", while its cultures are pre-modern and pre-Christian, and "their religions and mythologies are animist, polytheist and shamanist". The Wizard Radagast shares his name with a pagan god in Slavic mythology, and he has a shaman-like affinity for wild animals, skill with herbs, and ability to change his hue and shape.

== Northern courage ==
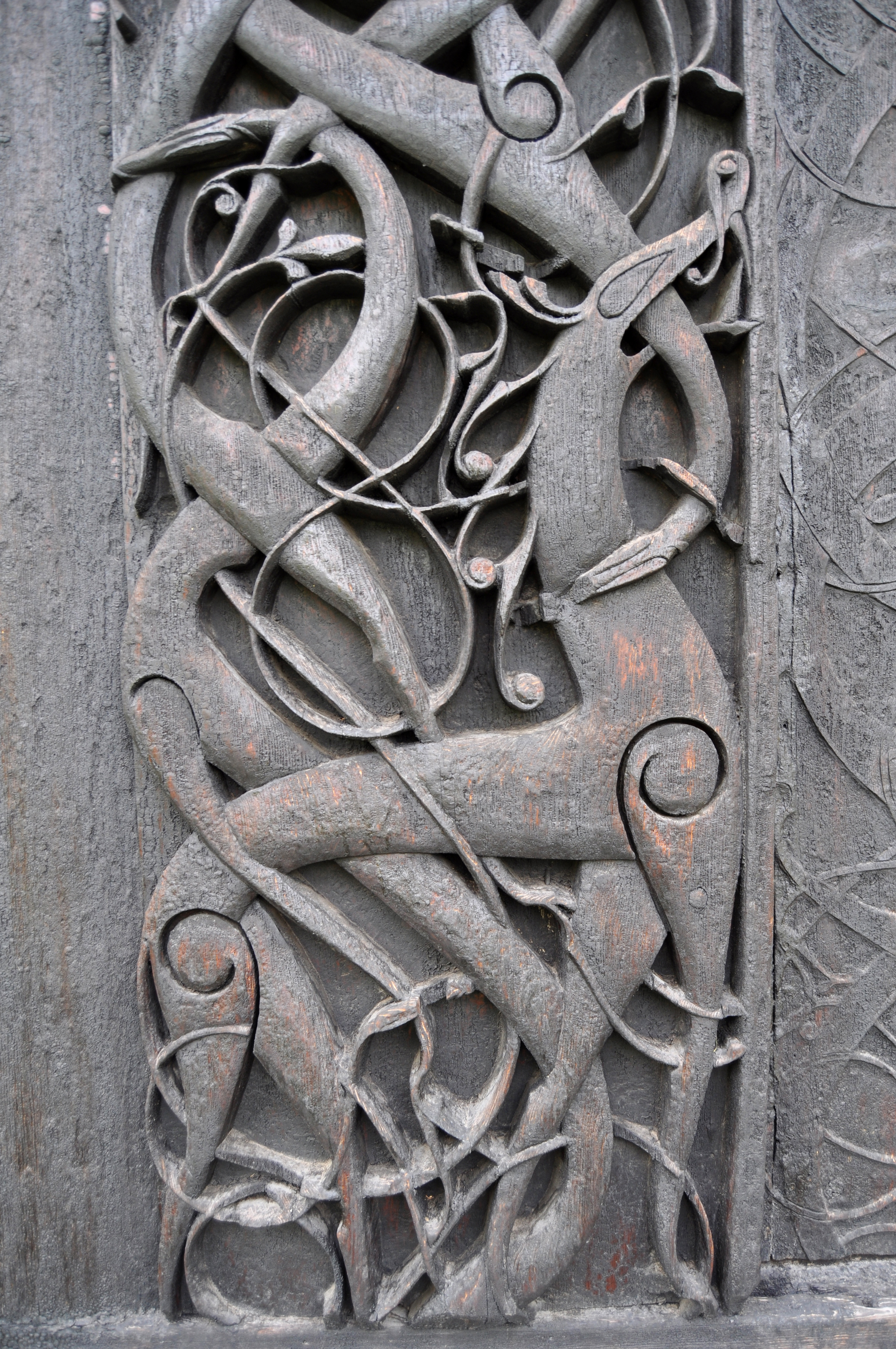
Ragnarök, where the Norse gods know they will die, but go to fight anyway. Urnes stave church.

Middle-earth is strongly influenced by the Old English poem Beowulf. Tolkien made extensive use of the poem in his Middle-earth writings, not least for his boldly Anglo-Saxon Riders of Rohan. One aspect of paganism, the Northern courage so prominent in Beowulf, appears as a central virtue in The Lord of the Rings. The Tolkien scholar Tom Shippey takes the wildly blowing battle-horns of the Riders of Rohan, storming into battle, to mean "bravado and recklessness", that "he who fears for his life shall lose it, but that dying undaunted is no defeat; furthermore that this was true before the Christian myth that came to explain why". The medievalist Elizabeth Solopova contrasts the hero and future king Aragorn with the old Steward of Gondor, Denethor, who is incapable of such Northern courage. Shippey observes that Denethor's other opposite, King Théoden of Rohan, lives by Northern courage, and dies through Denethor's despair. Tolkien stated in his 1936 lecture The Monsters and the Critics that he was inspired by the apocalyptic Norse legend of Ragnarök, where the gods know that they are doomed in their final battle for the world, but go to fight anyway. Even the home-loving Hobbits Frodo and Sam share this courage, knowing they have little prospect of returning home from their desperate mission to Mount Doom.

== Virtuous paganism ==
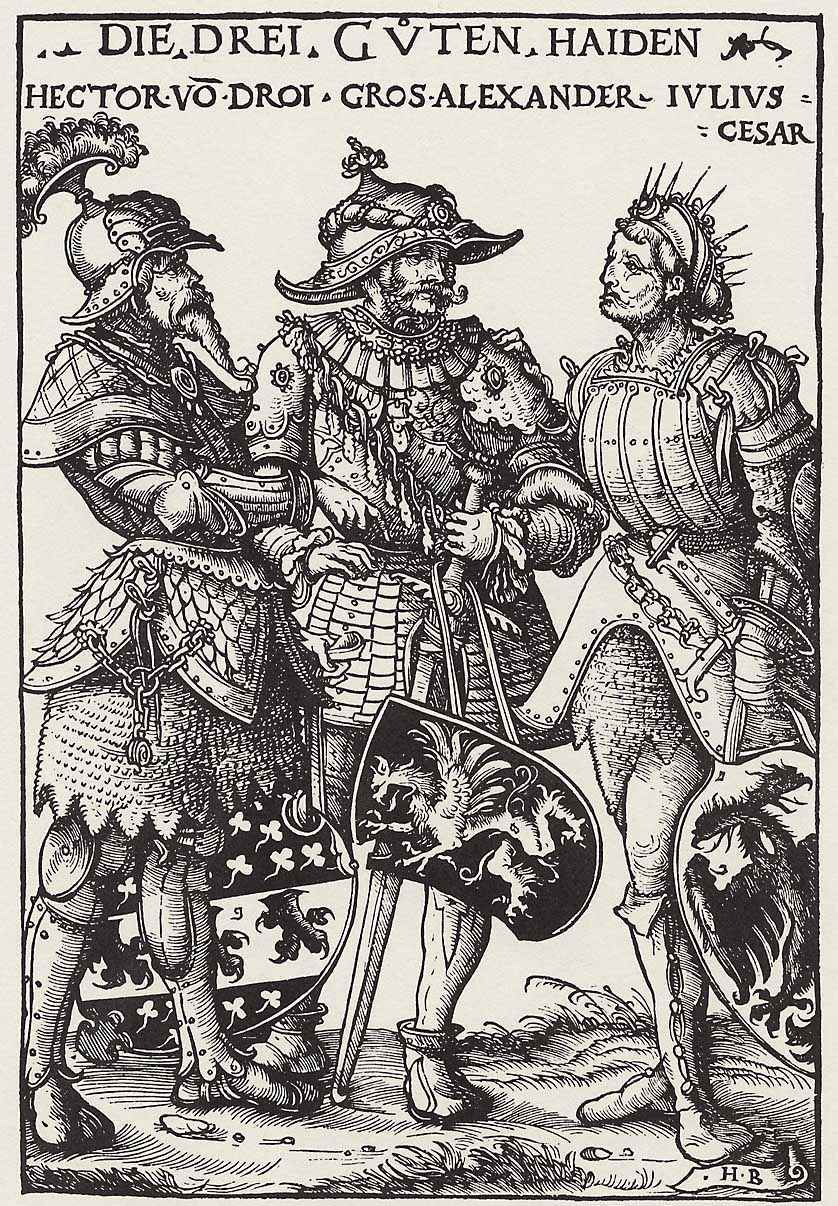
Tolkien shared the Catholic hope that God had a plan for virtuous pagans like Aragorn. Woodcut The Three Good Pagans by Hans Burgkmair, 1519

Since the Third Age of Middle-earth was long before the time of Christ, its inhabitants were necessarily pagan; the Tolkien scholar Paul H. Kocher comments that "having made the times pre-Christian, [Tolkien] has freed himself from the need to deal with them in a Christian context, which would be awkward if applied to elves, ents, dwarves, and the rest." For a Christian like Tolkien, this raised the question of whether at least its most virtuous characters could be saved. The concept of virtuous paganism became relevant to Romanticism with its interest in North European mythology or enthusiasm for the rediscovered pagan ethos of the Icelandic sagas. Shippey argues that the fiction of J. R. R. Tolkien is significantly based on this concept:

Tolkien was "rather disturbed by [an Armageddon which the wrong side wins (Ragnarök)]: he saw that the ethos it represented could be used by either side, as indeed it was in the deliberate cultivation of Götterdämmerung by the Nazi leadership a few years later. Nevertheless it did provide an image of heroic virtue which could exist, and could be admired, outside the Christian framework. In some respects (as you can see in his 1936 Beowulf lecture...) the Old Norse 'theory of courage' might even be regarded as ethically superior to the Classical if not to the Christian world-view, in that it demanded commitment to virtue without any offer of lasting reward. ... He also felt that Old Norse mythology provided a model for what one might call 'virtuous paganism,' which was heathen; conscious of its own inadequacy, and so ripe for conversion; but not yet sunk into despair and disillusionment like so much of 20th-century post-Christian literature; a mythology which was in its way light-hearted."

Shippey analyses "The Tale of Aragorn and Arwen", an appendix to The Lord of the Rings, for what it says about Tolkien's delicate balance between open Christianity and his treatment of his characters as heathens, a word that Shippey observes Tolkien uses very sparingly. Shippey notes that both Aragorn and Arwen are pagan, though Aragorn is "remarkably virtuous .. without even the faults of Theoden, and he foreknows his death like a [Christian] saint". Shippey notes that Arwen is inconsolable, seeing nothing after death, rejecting Aragorn's "we are not bound for ever to the circles of the world, and beyond them is more than memory. Farewell!"; as Shippey says, "Arwen is not comforted" by this; none of the traditional consolations of religion are present.

The salvation of a pagan who had done wrong is discussed in The Lord of the Rings in connection with the death of Boromir, one of the nine members of the Fellowship of the Ring. In Christian terms, Boromir atones for his assault on the Ring-bearer Frodo by single-handedly but vainly defending Merry and Pippin from Orcs, illustrating the Catholic theme of the importance of good intention, especially at the point of death. This is clear from Gandalf's statement: "But he [Boromir] escaped in the end.... It was not in vain that the young hobbits came with us, if only for Boromir's sake." (Note: Tolkien 1954, book 3, ch 5 "The White Rider")

== A Christian author's pagan world ==
While Tolkien embodied Christianity in The Lord of the Rings, the events take place in a pagan era imagined to be long before Christianity.

The scholar George Clark writes that Tolkien resembled the Beowulf poet in being

a learned Christian who re-created a heroic world and story in an implicitly Christian universe governed by a God whose existence and nature the poem's wiser characters intuit without the benefit of revelation. Tolkien's Beowulf poet was a version of himself, and his authorial persona in creating [The Lord of the Rings] was a version of that Beowulf poet.

The historian Ronald Hutton writes that in depicting a pagan Middle-earth, the Christian Tolkien was setting up an interesting relationship between his own religion and his invented world. He notes that Tolkien made this hard to investigate: he avoided biography, disliked critics, and distrusted analysis of literature based on the author rather than the work; and further, apart from his Letters, he left no memoirs and few clues in his diaries. Hutton suggests that the many unsent drafts of letters indicate that Tolkien was embarrassed by the question, as he wanted to be clear about his Christianity, and was pleased if people could glimpse that through his writings, but his remarks about the presence of Catholicism in The Lord of the Rings were brief and difficult to interpret, as he had been stung by criticism of the absence of religion in the work. Hutton cites Verlyn Flieger's statement that Tolkien's faith was "subject to doubt and losses of confidence", and even in later life he wrote to his son Michael that he was constantly tempted to unbelief.

Hutton sees three, sometimes "discordant", elements in Middle-earth's (religious) cosmos. There is a single male supreme being, Eru Iluvatar, "in personality much like a Christian God". A heavenly choir of beings, the Ainur, serve him, while one, Melko/Morgoth, rebels against him, like Satan among the angels. Hutton calls this Christianity with a Neoplatonic twist. However, secondly, the Ainur are not pure and virginal, but live in the world (Arda), have sex and quarrels, and make mistakes. This, he writes, is like the pagan Norse gods, or the classical era gods of Mount Olympus: "a full-blown pagan Neoplatonism". Thirdly, unlike the ancient gods, his gods are at best only sporadically interested in the affairs of Middle-earth; instead, they defend their own "fairyland", Valinor, and the rest of the world is like a fairy-tale in that it is seen through the eyes of elves or hobbits, not of humans. This, he writes, is "utterly un-Christian", and he finds it striking how badly they fit together. Thus, questions like what happens to humans after they die are handled differently in the early and later phases of his writing. The goddess Fui acts like Persephone, the Greek goddess of the underworld, judging the dead and sending them to "a dim plain", or to be tortured by the evil Melko, while a few are brought to the enchanted realm. Hutton notes that while Christopher Tolkien tried "gamely" to fit this to the Catholic scheme of purgatory, hell, and heaven, it "obviously" fits better with the Homeric or Virgilian accounts of the afterlife. If this was Christianity, Hutton writes, it would be a heretical form; he prefers to call it pagan.

== See also ==
- Tolkien and the classical world
- Tolkien and the Celtic
