= Radagast =

Wizard in J.R.R. Tolkien's fictional Middle-earth

Radagast the Brown
- Middle-earth character

In-universe information
- Alias: Aiwendil
- Race: Maiar (wizards)
- Book(s): The Hobbit (1937); The Fellowship of the Ring (1954); The Silmarillion (1977); Unfinished Tales (1980)

Radagast the Brown is a fictional character in J. R. R. Tolkien's legendarium. A wizard and associate of Gandalf, he appears briefly in The Hobbit, The Lord of the Rings, The Silmarillion, and Unfinished Tales.

His role in Tolkien's writings is so slight that it has been described as a plot device, though scholars have noted his contribution to the evident paganism in Middle-earth. He played a more significant role in Peter Jackson's The Hobbit film series, where he was portrayed by Sylvester McCoy. Some aspects of his characterisation were invented for the films, but the core elements of his character—namely communing with animals, skill with herbs, and shamanistic ability to change his shape and colours—are all described in Tolkien's works. He is also a character in role-playing video games based on Tolkien's writings.

== Appearances ==
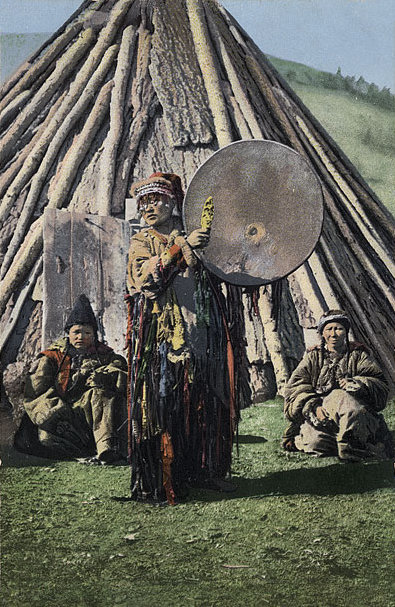
Tolkien's Radagast, with his affinity for animals, knowledge of herbs, and shape-changing abilities, has been compared to a shaman. Altai shaman pictured.

Unfinished Tales explains that Radagast, like the other Wizards, came from Valinor around the year 1000 of the Third Age of Middle-earth and was one of the angelic Maiar. His original name is said to have been Aiwendil, meaning bird-friend in Tolkien's invented language of Quenya. Yavanna, one of the god-like Valar, forces Radagast's fellow wizard Saruman to accept him as a companion, which, Tolkien says, may have been one of the reasons Saruman was contemptuous of him, to the point of scornfully calling him "simple" and "a fool". (Note: Tolkien 1980, Unfinished Tales, part 4, ch. 2 "The Istari") However, he is an ally and confidant of Gandalf, who describes him in The Hobbit as his "cousin". He is a friend of the skin-changer Beorn, something that Gandalf relies upon to get his party of Dwarves and a Hobbit accepted by a sceptical Beorn. (Note: Tolkien 1937, The Hobbit, ch. 7 "Queer Lodgings")

Radagast lives at Rhosgobel on the western eaves of Mirkwood, its name deriving from Sindarin rhosc gobel, meaning "brown village". Radagast has a strong affinity for—and relationship with—wild animals. It is said he speaks the many tongues of birds, and is a "master of shapes and changes of hue". Radagast is described by Gandalf as "never a traveller, unless driven by great need", "a worthy Wizard", and "honest". (Note: Tolkien 1954, The Fellowship of the Ring, book 2, ch. 2 "The Council of Elrond")

In The Fellowship of the Ring, during the Council of Elrond, Gandalf tells of a previous encounter with Radagast. Radagast was unwittingly used by Saruman to lure Gandalf to his tower of Orthanc, where Gandalf was captured. Fortuitously, Radagast also helped rescue him by sending Gwaihir the eagle to Orthanc with news of the movements of Sauron's forces. When Gwaihir saw that Gandalf was imprisoned on the top of the tower he carried him off to safety. The only other reference to Radagast in The Lord of the Rings is after the Council of Elrond when scouts are sent out. It is reported that Radagast is not at his home at Rhosgobel. (Note: Tolkien 1954, The Fellowship of the Ring, book 2, ch. 3 "The Ring Goes South")

The Silmarillion briefly summarizes the same events in Of the Rings of Power and the Third Age, stating that Radagast is "the friend of all birds and beasts", (Note: Tolkien 1977, The Silmarillion, Of the Rings of Power and the Third Age) and noting that he innocently helps Saruman to assemble "a great host of spies" including many birds.

== Etymology and origins ==
The in-fiction etymology, according to the essay "The Istari" in Unfinished Tales, is that the name Radagast means "tender of beasts" in Adûnaic, one of Tolkien's fictional languages. However, Christopher Tolkien says that his father intended to change this derivation and bring Radagast in line with the other wizard-names, Gandalf and Saruman, by associating it with the old language of the Men of the Vales of Anduin. No alternative meaning is provided with this new association; indeed, Tolkien stated that the name was "not now clearly interpretable". His title the Brown is simply a reference to his earth-brown robes; each of the wizards has a cloak of a different colour.

The name Radagast is found in Edward Gibbon's 1776–1789 Decline and Fall of the Roman Empire, in the form "Radagaisus", the name of a Gothic king. Slavic mythology contains a god named Radegast; this has been interpreted as "welcome guest", making him the god of hospitality. Tolkien's wizard may represent an echo of this Slavic tradition, a rare source among all the diverse influences on Tolkien's writings.

Tolkien wrote that Josef Madlener's "Der Berggeist", which shows a man in a hat seated in a forest, communing with a wild deer, inspired his Gandalf and set him thinking about the wizards Gandalf, Saruman, and Radagast.

== Analysis ==
Radagast appears so briefly that he has been described as a plot device for Saruman's treachery, rather than a genuine character. From the clues given, that he is a "master of shapes and a changer of hues", his friendship and communication with animals, and his skill in herbs, he resembles a shaman. He has been described as "one of the most interesting enigmas in Tolkien's writings"; given the treason of Saruman, he and Gandalf are the only two wizards available to counter Sauron, but Radagast fails to answer Elrond's call.

In a letter, Tolkien wrote that Radagast gave up his mission as a Wizard by becoming too obsessed with animals and plants, but stated that he did not believe that Radagast's failure was as great as Saruman's. (Note: Carpenter 2023, Letters, #156 to Robert Murray, S.J., 4 November 1954) Christopher Tolkien commented that Radagast might not have failed completely, as he was specifically chosen by the Vala Yavanna for a mission to protect the plants and animals.

The Tolkien scholar Patrick Curry writes that the Slavic Radagast is the pagan patron of the Czech Beskyd mountains, depicted with a bird atop his horned helmet. In his view, this suggests that Tolkien's Radagast is one of many examples of paganism in Middle-earth.

== Adaptations ==
=== In film ===
Radagast was played as "a bumbling hero" by Sylvester McCoy in Peter Jackson's film trilogy of The Hobbit.

In Peter Jackson's The Hobbit: An Unexpected Journey, Radagast is played by Sylvester McCoy, and is expanded far beyond his brief role in the book. McCoy stated that he saw Radagast as "very otherworldly with, as Tolkien depicts him, an empathy and kinship with nature, a Middle-earth version of St Francis of Assisi". McCoy added that while Radagast was rather absent-minded, he comes out as "a bumbling hero". As for his house, McCoy said that the idea was that the tree decided to grow right through it, and Radagast agreed that he and the tree could live together. In the film, Radagast is the first wizard to visit Dol Guldur after he realizes that an evil power has infected the wood in which he lives. He discovers that a Necromancer (who turns out to be Sauron) has taken residence in the ruined fortress. In Dol Guldur he encounters the spirit of the Witch-king of Angmar, as well as the shadow of the Necromancer himself, and escapes with the Morgul blade taken from the Witch-king. Radagast's means of transportation is a sled pulled by enormous rabbits, a concept entirely original to the movie. Radagast meets Gandalf, Bilbo Baggins, and the Dwarves en route to Erebor, and tells them of his discovery in Dol Guldur. When Thorin's Company are attacked by Orcs riding Wargs, Radagast mounts his sled and provides a distraction. Later, Saruman makes contemptuous remarks about Radagast during a meeting with Gandalf, Elrond, and Galadriel. The writer Brian Sibley comments that the fact that Tolkien said little about Radagast gave Jackson's screenwriters freedom to make of the character what they liked. The Economist wrote that Radagast the Brown had been created from Tolkien's "sparse and bare" hints as to his character. The sled chase was filmed in the Strath Taieri glacial valley of New Zealand's South Island, strewn with real boulders.

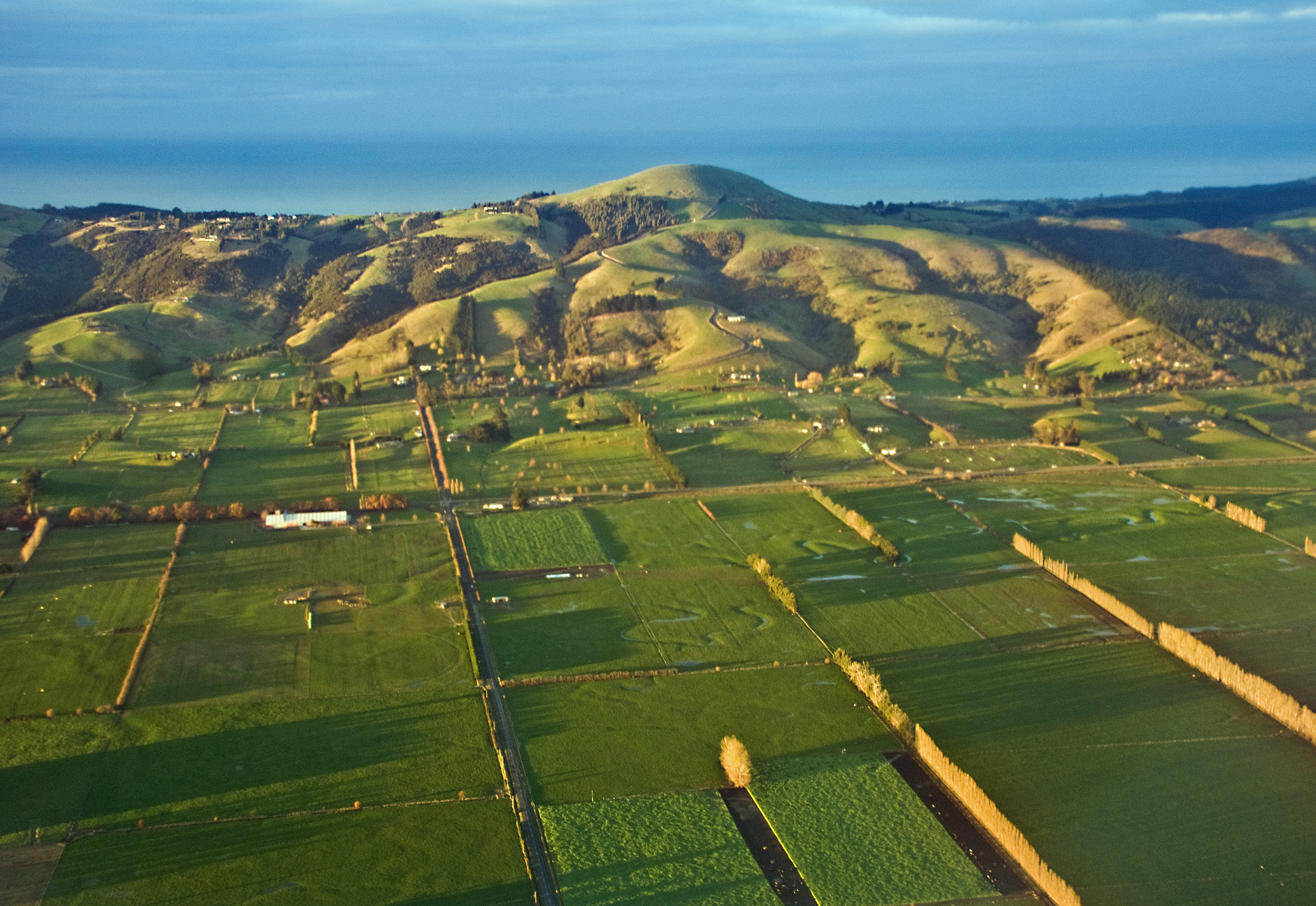
Radagast's sled chase in The Hobbit: An Unexpected Journey was filmed in the Strath Taieri, Otago, New Zealand

In The Hobbit: The Desolation of Smaug, Radagast appears with Gandalf in a few scenes. The two wizards investigate an empty tomb, determining that the Nazgûl are once again awake and have been summoned. Gandalf bids Radagast to go and tell Galadriel of all they find, and that the White Council must make a pre-emptive move on Dol Guldur. Inside the ruins, Gandalf confronts the Necromancer and finds that he is indeed Sauron, just as Radagast had thought.

In The Hobbit: The Battle of the Five Armies, Radagast arrives in Dol Guldur as the White Council battle Sauron and the Nazgûl, and carries the wounded Gandalf on his sled. In the final battle, Radagast leads a charge of the Great Eagles at the end of the battle to assist the Dwarves, Men, and Elves against the Orcs.

=== In games ===
Radagast features in computer and video games such as those from Games Workshop. He plays an expanded role in the massively multiplayer online role-playing game The Lord of the Rings Online, which makes him a leader in a part of Middle-earth, allowing players to interact with him. Radagast also features in The Lord of the Rings: War in the North

== Sources ==
- Carpenter, Humphrey, ed. (2023) [1981]. The Letters of J. R. R. Tolkien: Revised and Expanded Edition. New York: HarperCollins. ISBN 978-0-35-865298-4.
- Curry, Patrick (1998) [1997]. Defending Middle-Earth: Tolkien: Myth and Modernity. HarperCollins. ISBN 978-0-261-10371-9.
- Hammond, Wayne G.; Scull, Christina (2005). The Lord of the Rings: A Reader's Companion. HarperCollins. ISBN 978-0-00-720907-1.
- Holston, Kim R.; Winchester, Tom (2018). Science Fiction, Fantasy and Horror Film Sequels, Series and Remakes: An Illustrated Filmography, Volume II (1996-2016). McFarland. ISBN 978-0-7864-9685-3.
- Shippey, Tom (2005) [1982]. The Road to Middle-Earth: How J. R. R. Tolkien Created a New Mythology (Third ed.). HarperCollins. ISBN 978-0-261-10275-0.
- Sibley, Brian (2012). The Hobbit: An Unexpected Journey Official Movie Guide. Houghton Mifflin. ISBN 978-0-547-89930-5.
- Tolkien, J. R. R. (1937). The Hobbit. United Kingdom: George Allen & Unwin.
- Tolkien, J. R. R. (1954). The Fellowship of the Ring. Allen & Unwin. OCLC 647030791.
- Tolkien, J. R. R. (1977). Christopher Tolkien (ed.). The Silmarillion. Boston: Houghton Mifflin. ISBN 978-0-395-25730-2.
- Tolkien, J. R. R. (1980). Christopher Tolkien (ed.). Unfinished Tales. Boston: Houghton Mifflin. ISBN 978-0-395-29917-3.
