= Luise Rinser =

German novelist and short story writer

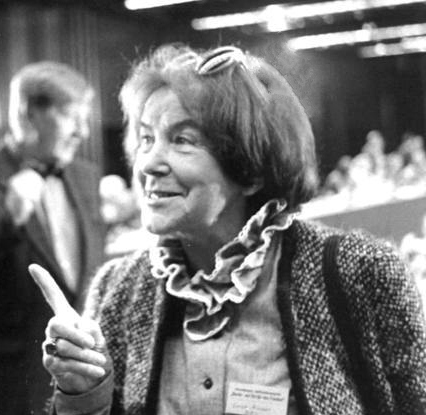
Luise Rinser (1987)

Luise Rinser (30 April 1911 – 17 March 2002) was a German writer, best known for her novels and short stories.

== Early life and education ==
Luise Rinser was born on 30 April 1911 in Pitzling, a constituent community of Landsberg am Lech, in Upper Bavaria. The house in which she was born still exists. She was educated at a Volksschule in Munich, where she scored high marks in her exams. After the exams, she worked as an assistant in various schools in Upper Bavaria, where she learned the reformed pedagogical methods of Franz Seitz, who influenced her teaching and writing.

During these years, she wrote her first short stories for the journal Herdfeuer. Although she did not join the Nazi Party, after 1936 she belonged to the NS-Frauenschaft and until 1939 she also belonged to the Teachers' Association. In 1939, she gave up teaching and got married.

== Later life ==
=== Imprisonment ===
In 1944, she was denounced by a Nazi 'friend' and imprisoned in the Traunstein women's prison. Rinser later claimed she was charged with high treason and that only the German defeat saved her from a likely death sentence. However, documents from the Nazi-era People's Court show that she was charged with 'undermining the military', which could also carry the death penalty but did not imply conscious intent to overthrow the government. The indictment was issued in March 1945, three months after Rinser was released on a Christmas leave from which she never returned. Rinser would subsequently claim she had been denied leave and remained in prison until April 1945.

Rinser drew attention after the war with the 1946 publication of her Prison Journal (Gefängnistagebuch). The inmates of the prison were not just political dissidents. She shared her life there with common thieves, sex offenders, vagrants and Jehovah's witnesses. Being among such people was a new experience for Rinser, with her middle-class background. The prisoners had to contend with filth, stench and disease. Starvation was rampant.

Rinser herself managed to survive by helping herself to what she could pilfer in the breadcrumb factory where she was placed. She discovered for the first time how the under-privileged and the downtrodden lived and survived. She also discovered herself. The book became a bestseller and the English-speaking world discovered her through the English translation, Prison Journal. In 1947, Rinser changed her views about the usefulness of the book when she compared her experiences in Traunstein to what had taken place in Nazi concentration camps. However, the book was reissued twenty years later.

She described herself in an ode to Adolf Hitler as opposed to the Nazis.

=== Marriage ===
Her first husband and the father of her two sons, the composer and choir director Horst Günther Schnell, died on the Russian Front. After his death, she married the communist writer Klaus Herrmann. This marriage was annulled around 1952. From 1945 to 1953, she was a freelance writer for the newspaper Neue Zeitung München, and took up residence in Munich.

In 1954, she married the composer Carl Orff, and they divorced in 1959. She formed a close friendship with the Korean composer Isang Yun, with the abbot of a monastery, and with the theologian Karl Rahner. In 1959, she moved to Rome, and later from 1965 onwards she lived in Rocca di Papa, near Rome, where she was recognised as an honored resident in 1986. Afterwards, she lived at her apartment in Unterhaching near Munich where she died on 17 March 2002.

=== Political activities ===
Rinser kept herself active in political and social discussions in Germany. She supported Willy Brandt in his 1971-72 campaign and demonstrated with the writers Heinrich Böll, Günter Grass and many others against the deployment of Pershing II missiles in Germany. She became a sharp critic of the Catholic Church without ever leaving it and was an accredited journalist at the Second Vatican Council. She also criticized, in open letters, the prosecution of Andreas Baader, Gudrun Ensslin and others, and wrote to Ensslin's father: "Gudrun has a friend in me for life.".

In 1984, she was proposed by the Greens as a candidate for the office of President of Germany.

=== Travel ===
In 1972, she travelled to the Soviet Union, the United States, Spain, India, Indonesia, South Korea, North Korea, and Iran. She saw the Iranian leader Ruhollah Khomeini as "a shining model for the states of the Third World." – Japan, Colombia and many other countries. She stood up vociferously for the abolition of the Abortion paragraph § 218 in its current form. She also served as a leading voice for the Catholic left in Germany.

Between 1980 and 1992, she traveled to North Korea 11 times, where she met with North Korean leader Kim Il Sung 45 times. She wrote about her travels in her book Nordkoreanisches Reisetagebuch, in which she approvingly described North Korea as a "farm-loving country owned by a farmer father" and a model example of "socialism with a human face" where crime, poverty, and prison camps are unknown and praised the minimal environmental impact of its rationed economy. On her 1981 trip, she was accompanied by Rudolf Bahro, who also found much to admire in North Korea, saying that "It is a lot of crap to put Hitler, Stalin, and Kim Il Sung in the same bag. I believe that [Kim] is, in fact, a great man".

== Posthumous revelations ==
Rinser died in 2002. Contrary to what she had said and written about herself and what others had written about her previously, the biography Luise Rinser – Ein Leben in Widersprüchen (Luise Rinser – A Life of Contradictions), published in 2011 by the Spanish author Sánchez de Murillo exposed her as an 'early' ambitious Nazi. As a schoolteacher, she had herself denounced her Jewish headmaster to further her own career. Murillo says, "She lied to all of us." Her son, Christoph Rinser, collaborated with Murillo in researching this 'authorised' biography.

== Awards and honors ==
- 1952 René Schickele-Preis-Ehrung
- 1975 Christophorus-Buchpreis der Christophorus-Stiftung des HUK-Verbandes
- 1977 Großes Verdienstkreuz des Verdienstorden der Bundesrepublik Deutschland
- 1979 Roswitha-Gedenkmedaille (Roswitha-Preis) der Stadt Bad Gandersheim
- 1979 Premio letterario internazionale mediterraneo, Palermo, Italien
- 1980 Premio Europa, Fiuggi, Italien
- 1985 "Accademico ordinario" der Accademia tiberina, Rome, Italy
- 1985 Johannes Bobrowski-Medaille der CDU der DDR
- 1986 Ehrendoktorwürde der Universität Pjöngjang (North Korea)
- 1987 Heinrich Heine Prize des Ministeriums für Kultur der DDR
- 1987 Heinrich Mann Prize of the Akademie der Künste der DDR
- 1987 "Donna in Arte", Provinz Rom, Italy
- 1987 "Autore dell'anno 1987", Città di Palestrina (Latium), Italy
- 1988 Elisabeth-Langgässer-Literaturpreis der Stadt Alzey
- 1988 Premio Giustina Rocca, Trani, Italy
- 1991 Internationaler Literaturpreis Ignazio Silone
- 1991 Kunst-und Kultur-Preis der Stadt Landsberg am Lech

== Novels ==
- Hochebene, Kassel: Harriet Schleber 1948
- Die Stärkeren, Kassel 1948
- Mitte des Lebens, Frankfurt: S. Fischer 1950; Engl. Nina, 1956
- Daniela, Frankfurt 1953
- Der Sündenbock, Frankfurt 1955
- Abenteuer der Tugend, Frankfurt 1957
- Die vollkommene Freude, Frankfurt 1962
- Ich bin Tobias, Frankfurt 1966
- Der schwarze Esel, Frankfurt 1974
- Mirjam, Frankfurt 1983
- Silberschuld, Frankfurt 1987
- Abaelards Liebe, Frankfurt 1991; Engl. Abelard's Love, 1998
- Aeterna (mit H. C. Meiser), Frankfurt 2000

== Short stories ==
- Die gläsernen Ringe, Berlin: Fischer, 1940; Engl. Rings of Glass, 1958
- Erste Liebe, München: Desch 1946
- Jan Lobel aus Warschau, Kassel 1948
- Ein Bündel weißer Narzissen, Frankfurt: S. Fischer 1956
- Geh fort, wenn du kannst (Nachwort: Hans Bender), Frankfurt 1959; Engl. Leave If You Can, 2010
- Weihnachts-Triptychon (Mit Scherenschnitten von Otto Diethelm), Zürich: Arche, 1963
- Septembertag, Frankfurt 1964
- Die rote Katze, Fünf Erzählungen, Frankfurt: Fischer Bibliothek 1981
- Geschichten aus der Löwengrube, Acht Erzählungen, Frankfurt 1986

== Autobiographical writings ==
- Gefängnistagebuch, München: Zinnen (Kurt Desch) 1946; Engl. A Woman's Prison Journal, 1988
- Baustelle. Eine Art Tagebuch 1967–1970, Frankfurt: S. Fischer 1970
- Grenzübergänge. Tagebuch-Notizen 1970–1972, Frankfurt 1972
- Kriegsspielzeug. Tagebuch 1972–1978, Frankfurt 1978
- Nordkoreanisches Reisetagebuch, Frankfurt 1981
- Den Wolf umarmen (Autobiographie, Teil 1), Frankfurt 1981
- Winterfrühling. Tagebuchaufzeichnungen 1979–1982, Frankfurt 1982
- Im Dunkeln singen. Tagebuchaufzeichnungen 1982–1985, Frankfurt 1985
- Wachsender Mond. Tagebuchaufzeichnungen 1985–1988, Frankfurt 1988
- Ort meiner Kindheit: Wessobrunn, Freiburg 1991
- Wir Heimatlosen. Tagebuchaufzeichnungen 1989–1992, Frankfurt 1992
- Saturn auf der Sonne (Autobiographie, Teil 2), Frankfurt 1994
- Kunst des Schattenspiels. Tagebuchaufzeichnungen 1994–1997, Frankfurt 1997

== Writing for children and teens ==
- Das Ohlstadter Kinder-Weihnachtsspiel, München 1946
- Martins Reise, Zürich: Atlantis 1949
- Sie zogen mit dem Stern. Eine Bubenweihnacht, München: Don Bosco 1950
- Jugend unserer Zeit. Fotografien gedeutet von Luise Rinser, Würzburg: Echter-Verlag 1967
- Bruder Feuer, Stuttgart: Thienemann 1975
- Das Geheimnis des Brunnens, Stuttgart 1979
- Kursbuch für Mädchen, Frauenfeld 1979
- Mit wem reden, Stuttgart 1980
- Drei Kinder und ein Stern (ill. v. Hella Seith), (Neuausgabe) Stuttgart: Gabriel 1994
- Das Squirrel. Eine Geschichte von sichtbaren und unsichtbaren Wesen (mit Blumenbildern von Sulamith Wülfing), (Neuausgabe) Grafing: Aquamarin 2004

== Special writings ==
- Pestalozzi und wir. Der Mensch und das Werk, Stuttgart: Günther 1947
- Die Wahrheit über Konnersreuth. Ein Bericht, Einsiedeln: Benziger 1954
- Fülle der Zeit. Carl Zuckmayer und sein Werk, Frankfurt 1956
- Der Schwerpunkt (Essays zu Annette Kolb, Franz Werfel, Carl Zuckmayer, Elisabeth Langgässer und Bert Brecht), Frankfurt 1960
- Vom Sinn der Traurigkeit (Felix Tristitia), Zürich: Arche 1962
- Ich weiß deinen Namen. 73 Fotographien gedeutet von Luise Rinser, Würzburg: Echter 1962
- Über die Hoffnung, Zürich 1964
- Gespräche über Lebensfragen, Würzburg 1966
- Hat Beten einen Sinn?, Zürich 1966
- Jugend unserer Zeit. Fotografien gedeutet von Luise Rinser, Würzburg 1967
- Gespräch von Mensch zu Mensch, Würzburg 1967
- Zölibat und Frau, Würzburg 1967
- Laie, nicht ferngesteuert, Zürich 1967
- Fragen, Antworten, Würzburg 1968
- Von der Unmöglichkeit und der Möglichkeit heute Priester zu sein, Zürich: NZN 1968
- Unterentwickeltes Land Frau. Untersuchungen, Kritik, Arbeitshypothesen, Würzburg 1970
- Hochzeit der Widersprüche, Percha: Schulz 1973
- Dem Tode geweiht? Lepra ist heilbar! (Mit 24 Bildtafeln; Fotos von Christoph Rinser), Percha 1974
- Wie wenn wir ärmer würden oder Die Heimkehr des verlorenen Sohnes, Percha 1974
- Hallo, Partner. Zeige mir, wie du dein Auto lenkst, und ich sage dir, wie (wer) du bist!, HUK-Verband 1974
- Leiden, Sterben, Auferstehen, Würzburg 1975
- Wenn die Wale kämpfen. Porträt eines Landes: Süd-Korea, Percha 1976
- Der verwundete Drache. Dialog über Leben und Werk des Komponisten Isang Yun, Frankfurt 1977
- Terroristen-Sympathisanten? Im Welt-Bild der Rechten. Eine Dokumentation, 1977
- Khomeini und der Islamische Gottesstaat. Eine große Idee. Ein großer Irrtum?, Percha 1979
- Kinder unseres Volkes (Buch zum Film). Deutschland, 1983. Regie: Stefan Rinser
- Wer wirft den Stein? Zigeuner sein in Deutschland. Eine Anklage, Stuttgart 1985
- Die Aufgabe der Musik in der Gesellschaft von heute, Frankfurt 1986
- In atomarer Bedrohung. Mit Grafiken von Frans Masereel, Karlsruhe: Loeper 1987
- Gratwanderung. Briefe der Freundschaft an Karl Rahner, München: Kösel 1994
- Mitgefühl als Weg zum Frieden. Meine Gespräche mit dem Dalai Lama, München 1995
- Leben im Augenblick. Kurze Texte zur Sinnfrage, hrsg. von Ute Zydek, München 1996
- Reinheit und Ekstase. Auf der Suche nach der vollkommenen Liebe (mit H. C. Meiser), München: List 1998
- Bruder Hund. Eine Legende, München: Kösel 19

== Literature ==
- Gudrun Gill: Die Utopie Hoffnung bei Luise Rinser. Eine sozio-psychologische Studie. New York u.a.: Lang 1991. (= American university studies; Ser. 1; Germanic languages and literatures; 92), ISBN 0-8204-1366-6
- Stephanie Grollman: Das Bild des "Anderen" in den Tagebüchern und Reiseberichten Luise Rinsers. Würzburg: Königshausen u. Neumann 2000. (= Epistemata; Reihe Literaturwissenschaft; 322), ISBN 3-8260-1853-2
- Thomas Lother: Die Schuldproblematik in Luise Rinsers literarischem Werk. Frankfurt am Main u.a.: Lang 1991. (= Würzburger Hochschulschriften zur neueren deutschen Literaturgeschichte;13), ISBN 3-631-43866-4
- Selma Polat: Luise Rinsers Weg zur mystischen Religiosität. Glaube erwachsen aus Erfahrung. Mit einem Interview. Münster: Lit 2001. (= Literatur - Medien - Religion; 2), ISBN 3-8258-2536-1
- Luise Rinser, Materialien zu Leben und Werk, hrsg. v. Hans-Rüdiger Schwab. Frankfurt am Main: Fischer. 1986. (= Fischer-TB 5973), ISBN 3-596-25973-8
- Henning Falkenstein (2003). "Rinser, Luise". Neue Deutsche Biographie (in German). Vol. 21. Berlin: Duncker & Humblot. pp. 639–640.
- J. Jürgen Seidel (2004). "Rinser, Luise". In Bautz, Traugott (ed.). Biographisch-Bibliographisches Kirchenlexikon (BBKL) (in German). Vol. 23. Nordhausen: Bautz. cols. 1192–1197. ISBN 3-88309-155-3.
- Michael Kleeberg: "Glaubensüberhitzung. Sie hat den Zweifel produktiv gemacht: Luise Rinser zum neunzigsten Geburtstag". In: Frankfurter Rundschau, 28.4.2001.
