= Alessandro Turamini =

Alessandro Turamini (Montalcino, circa 1556 – Ferrara, circa 1605) was an Italian lawyer, jurist, philosopher, and poet. He is best known for his writings on law.

== Biography ==
Turamini graduated with a degree in civil law from the University of Siena in 24 June 1579. He became an Auditor of the Rota in Florence. His skill and writings led him to become professor of jurisprudence in Siena, Rome, and Naples. He was founder of a literary-philosophical society in Naples called the Accademia dei Rinforzati.

== Works ==
Among his works are:

- Ad Rubricam Pandectarum de legibus libri tres (1590) an "encyclopedia of law" published in Florence
- Collected Works (1770); collected by Lorenzo Maria Mehus (1717-1802), dedicated to the prelate Antonio Felice Zondadari

== Bibliography ==
- Nardi, Paolo (2020) [1960]. "TURAMINI, Alessandro". Dizionario Biografico degli Italiani, Volume 97: Trivulzio–Valeri (in Italian). Rome: Istituto dell'Enciclopedia Italiana. ISBN 978-8-81200032-6.
