= Herbert Vorgrimler =

- Born: 4 January 1929; Freiburg im Breisgau, German Reich
- Died: 12 September 2014 (aged 85); Münster, Germany
- Occupations: Author, theologian
- Known for: Contributing to the Lexikon für Theologie und Kirche

Herbert Vorgrimler (4 January 1929 – 12 September 2014) was a Catholic theologian and author who published over 90 books in German, 33 of which were translated into English.

== Works ==
Vorgrimler is known for his collaboration in 1965 with his doctoral advisor, Karl Rahner, SJ, on the Theological Dictionary.

In the 1970s, together with Stephanus Pfurtner, he supported in Germany the dialogue between the Roman Catholic Church and Freemasonry.

In Sacramental Theology, Vorgrimler describes a dogmatic approach to the sacraments, where he follows St. Thomas Aquinas in relating the sacraments directly to Christ, but he also expands on the role of the Church. Sacramental activity thus encompasses all of God's activity towards the Church because it always involves the elements of humanity and mystery / sacred. Vorgrimler is conscious of the distinction between sacramental activity and sacraments and understands the seven sacraments as existing objectively in the world, though not on their own grounds but always in relation to Christ and the Church.

== List of publications ==
- Theological Dictionary (1965), (with Karl Rahner), edited by Cornelius Ernst
- Sacramental Theology (1992), translated by Linda M. Maloney, Minnesota
