= Pagani =

Pagani may refer to:

- Pagani (surname), including a list of people with the name
- Pagani, Campania, town and comune in Campania, Italy
- Pagani Automobili, Italian car manufacturer
- Pagani Detention Center, detention center in the island of Lesbos, Greece
- Plural of Latin paganus, meaning pagan
