= Bosch Smart Manufacturing Conclave =

Bosch Smart Manufacturing Conclave (BSM) is an annual event and an invite only conference aimed to bring Industry 4.0 leaders and smart manufacturing practitioners from India and Europe. The first event was held in Mumbai on November 5, 2015, with over 300 attendees (Elite industry leaders) and an additional 50,000 people were expected to follow this event online.

In 2015, BSM was inaugurated by Mr. Amitabh Kant (Secretary, Department of Industrial Policy and Promotion, Ministry of Commerce and Industry) and the program included keynotes from Stefan Aßmann (Senior Vice President, Connected Industry, Robert Bosch GmbH) and Alexander Verl (chairman of the board, Fraunhofer Future Foundation, Fraunhofer-Gesellschaft).
