= Markus Sperandio =

Markus Sperandio (* 1966) is a German physician and physiologist. He is Professor of Physiology at LMU Munich.

== Life and education ==
Markus Sperandio studied medicine beginning in 1988 at the University of Trieste and the Free University of Berlin. He received his doctorate under Peter Gaehtgens in physiology with a dissertation on “Flow resistance of blood in terminal vascular networks”. In 1994, he completed the Second State Examination. He subsequently completed specialist training in Pediatrics with a focus on Neonatology, including the University Hospital Heidelberg, where he later also worked as a pediatrician and neonatologist.

== Scientific work ==
In addition to his clinical work, he devoted himself to biomedical research and worked, among other positions, as a postdoctoral researcher and scientific associate under Klaus Ley at the University of Virginia (USA). From 2002 to 2007, Sperandio led a research group at the University Hospital Heidelberg. Since 2007, he has been Professor of Vegetative Physiology at the LMU Biomedical Center on the Martinsried campus. There he leads a research group at the Institute for Cardiovascular Physiology and Pathophysiology.

The research of Markus Sperandio focuses on mechanisms of the inflammatory response and the migration of immune cells, especially neutrophil granulocytes, in the circulatory system. Central research topics include leukocyte recruitment during inflammation, development of the immune system in the fetus and newborns, as well as platelet and glycobiology. A particular focus of his work is the question of how the immune system develops before and after birth and why premature infants are particularly susceptible to infections.

He has been involved in various national and international research collaborations, including Collaborative Research Centres and Graduate Schools. For his research in the field of microcirculation and immune cell biology, Sperandio was awarded the Malpighi Award of the European Society for Microcirculation (ESM) in 2025.

In addition to his professorship, Sperandio served as interim director of the Institute for Cardiovascular Physiology and Pathophysiology and the Walter Brendel Centre for Experimental Medicine at LMU Munich from 2018 to 2022.
