= Amitabh Kant =

Indian civil servant (born 1956)

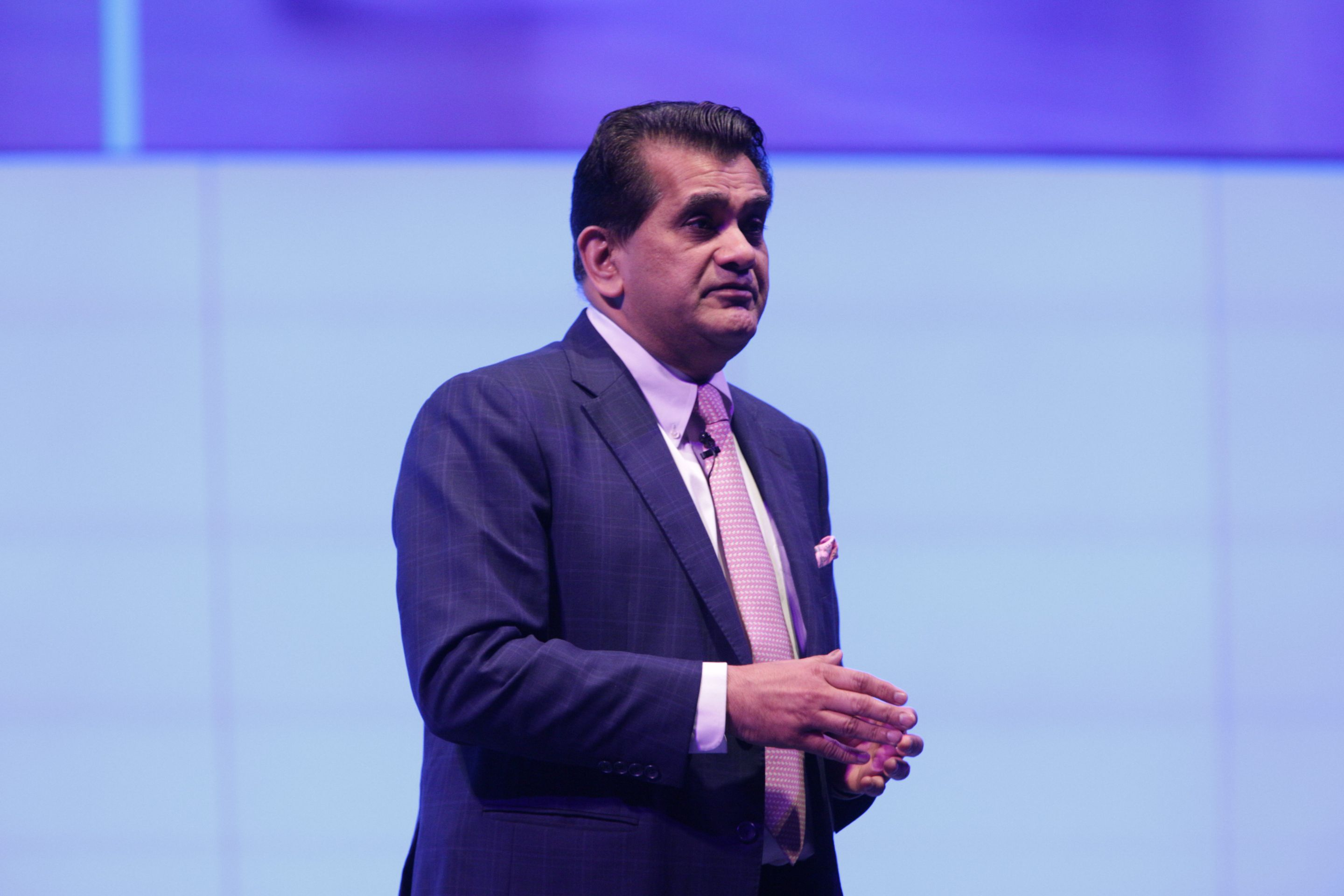
- Amitabh Kant at the WTTC Global Summit 2017

Indian Emissary to the G20 & G7
- In office 8 July 2022 – 16 June 2025
- Preceded by: Piyush Goyal

2nd CEO of NITI Aayog
- In office 17 February 2016 – 30 June 2022
- Preceded by: Sindhushree Khullar
- Succeeded by: Parameswaran Iyer

Personal details
- Born: 1 March 1956 (age 70) Varanasi, Uttar Pradesh, India
- Spouse: Ranjeeta Kant
- Education: St Stephen's College, Delhi; Delhi University; Jawaharlal Nehru University
- Occupation: Civil servant
- Website: Official website

Amitabh Kant (born 1 March 1956) is a retired 1980 batch IAS officer who served as India's G20 Sherpa from 8 July 2022 till 16 June 2025 and as the chief executive officer of NITI Aayog, a public policy think tank of the Government of India.

== Early life ==
Amitabh Kant was born on 1 March 1956. He first studied at Modern School, Delhi, graduated with a degree in Economics (Hons.) from St. Stephen's College, Delhi and earned an M.A. in International Relations from Jawaharlal Nehru University. He was a Chevening Scholar.

== Career ==
Kant began his Indian Administrative Service career in the Kerala cadre, working as sub collector of Thalassery, where he carried out infrastructural work such as widening roads, removing encroachments, relocating the town's fish market from the town-centre to the beach area and initiating the Tellicherry Carnival for communal harmony.

After his tenure in Tellicherry, Kant was appointed as the Managing Director of the Kerala State Co-operative Federation for Fisheries Development Ltd, known as 'Matsyafed'. In this role, he is credited with introducing fibreglass boats and outboard motor technology in the fisheries sector, as well as launching beach-level auctions.

As District Collector of Kozhikode (Calicut), he played a pivotal role in the expansion of the Calicut airport. His efforts included revamping the Mananchira Maidan, reconstructing the building of the Kozhikode Public Library and Research Centre, and organising the 'Malabar Mahotsav' cultural festival.

As Tourism Secretary in Kerala, Kant promoted the state as a tourist destination, and is credited with popularising the slogan "Kerala: God's Own Country" during his tenure.

After his term in Kerala, Kant was appointed as Joint Secretary in the Ministry of Tourism in 2001, where he stayed till 2007. During this time, he conceived the 'Incredible India' campaign through Ogilvy and Mather, intending to transform India into a sought-after tourist destination. He also conceptualised and executed the 'Atithi Devo Bhava' (Guest is God) campaign to train taxi drivers, tourist guides and immigration officials.

Later, as the Secretary of the Department of Industrial Policy and Promotion (DIPP), Kant drove initiatives such as "Make in India", "Start Up India" and "Ease of Doing Business".

Kant was CEO of NITI Aayog from 2016 to 2022. During his tenure, he chaired Empowered Group 3 for COVID-19 management and initiated national-level projects like Asset Monetization and National Mission for Transformative Mobility. Additionally, he advocated for natural farming methods. In this role, he drove India's Aspirational Districts Programme (ADP), aimed at improving the socio-economic indicators of 112 of India's most backwards districts.

He served as India's G20 Sherpa to Prime Minister Narendra Modi from 8 July 2022 till 16 June 2025.

India Today's High & Mighty rankings of 2019 featured Kant as one of the most powerful people in India under the category of "The Supercrats - India's Top Bureaucrats".

== Publications ==
Kant is the author of books Branding India-An Incredible Story, Incredible India 2.0, Made in India: 75 Years of Business and Enterprise, The Elephant Moves: India's New Place in the World co-authored with Amit Kapoor and How India scaled Mt G20: The Inside Story of The G20. He is also the editor of The Path Ahead- Transformative Ideas for India and has written over 500 articles in leading Indian and foreign publications.

== Honours ==
- The Order of the Rising Sun, Gold and Silver Star (2023)

== Controversies ==
In December 2020, Kant attracted controversy after remarking at a public event, organized by Swarajya magazine, that enacting "tough reforms" were hard in India, since it is "too much of a democracy".
