= Pagnani =

Pagnani is an Italian surname. Notable people with the surname include:

- Andreina Pagnani (1906–1981), Italian actress and voice actress
- Gino Pagnani (1927–2010), Italian actor and voice actor
- Lola Pagnani (born 1972), Italian actress

== See also ==
- Pagani (surname)
