= Peter Sodann =

German actor, director and politician (1936–2024)

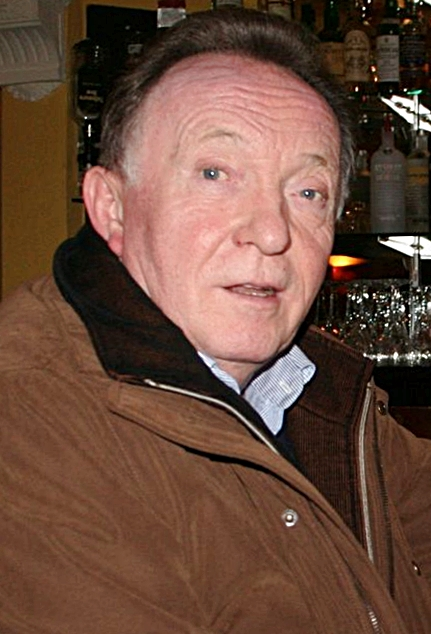

Peter Sodann (1 June 1936 – 5 April 2024) was a German actor, director and politician. He was the Left Party's nominee for the 2009 presidential election, but was not considered a serious candidate by the German media.

== Early life ==
Sodann was born on 1 June 1936 in Meissen to a working-class family. After training to be a toolmaker, he moved to Leipzig in order to study law. In 1959 he transferred to the Theaterhochschule Leipzig, where he led a cabaret group. The group's performance was deemed subversive by the East German authorities and closed in 1961. Sodann was arrested by the Stasi and spent nine months in prison and was on probation for four years.

== Acting career ==
In 1964, Sodann made his first performance with the Berliner Ensemble. In the following years, he acted and produced plays in Erfurt, Chemnitz and Magdeburg. In 1980, he moved to Halle and for years worked as a director there.

Sodann began acting in television shows during the late 1970s. He played John Schehr in the 1986 two-part TV film Ernst Thälmann. In 1991 he first appeared in his most famous screen role, Police Commissioner Bruno Ehrlicher, in the long-running crime series Tatort. He remained with the series until November 2007. From 2007 he starred in a traveling act "Ost-West-Vis-à-Vis" with CDU politician and former Labor Minister Norbert Blüm.

== Political activities ==
Sodann was a vocal supporter of the Party of Democratic Socialism (PDS), which in 2007 became the Left Party. In July 2005 he announced his interest in running as a candidate of the PDS in Saxony for the 2005 federal election. However, he later withdrew himself from considering, citing restrictions on media employment for Bundestag politicians.

On 13 October 2008, the Left Party's Bundestag delegation nominated Sodann as their candidate for the 2009 presidential election. As an actor-turned-politician, the German media compared him (usually as a criticism) to Ronald Reagan and Arnold Schwarzenegger. Since the German president is elected by the Bundesversammlung, in which the vast majority of seats would be held by the Christian Democrats and Social Democrats, Sodann stood little chance of winning. He finished third in the election, in which the incumbent Horst Köhler was re-elected.

== Personal life and death ==
Sodann was married to his second wife, Cornelia. He was the father of four children through his first marriage: Tina, Susanne, Franz and Karl. He died on 5 April 2024, at the age of 87.

== See also ==
- Neues Theater
- Peter Sodann Library
