= Sherpa (emissary) =

Representative of a government leader and summit host

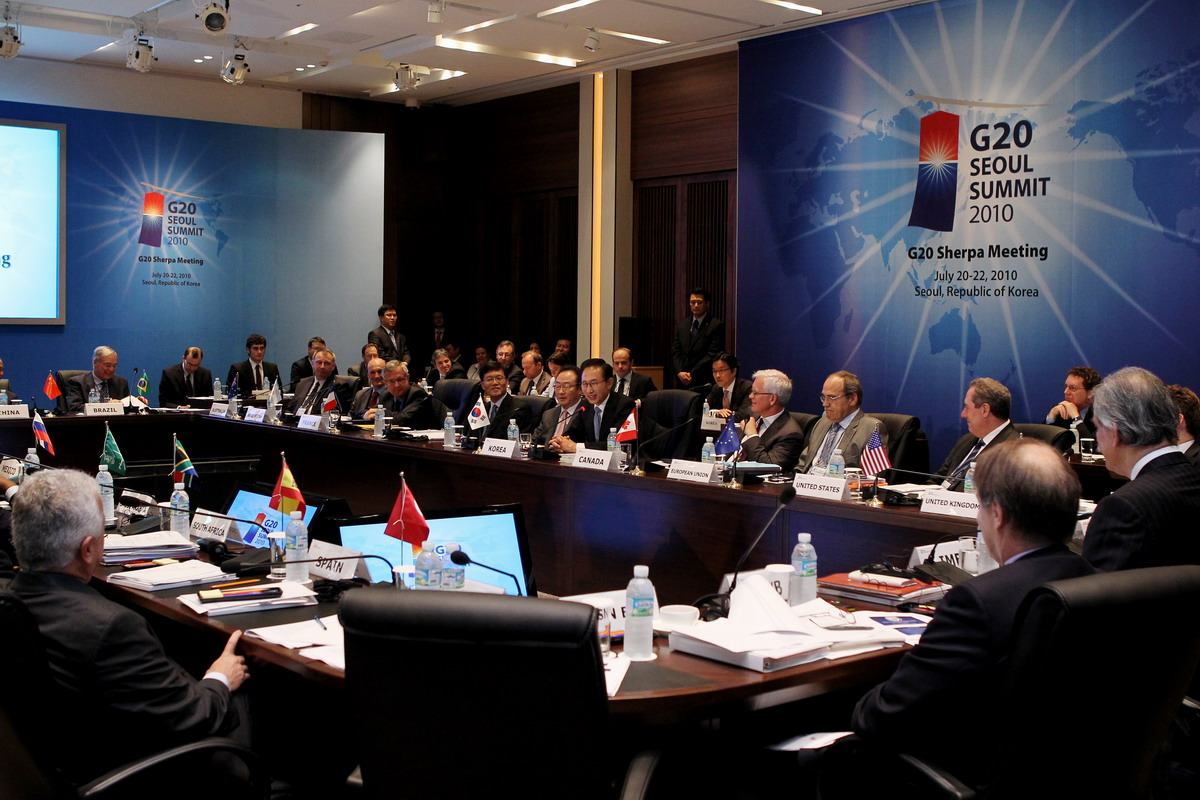
The sherpa meeting held in preparation for the G-20 Financial Summit in Seoul (2010)

A sherpa is the personal representative of a head of state or head of government who prepares an international summit, such as the annual G7 and G20 summits. Between the G7 summits there are multiple sherpa conferences where possible agreements are laid out. This reduces the amount of time and resources required at the negotiations of the heads of state at the final summit. The name sherpa—without further context—refers to sherpas for the G7 summit, but the designation can be extended to different regular conferences where the participation of the head of state is required. The sherpa is generally quite influential, although they do not have the authority to make a final decision about any given agreement.

The name is derived from the Sherpa people, a Nepalese ethnic group, who serve as guides and porters in the Himalayas, a reference to the fact that the sherpa does all the heavy lifting for the principal to reach a major summit.

== European Union ==
In the European Union, the name was originally used informally for representatives of the member states. Usually, representatives conduct preparatory work for the ministers. The only decisions with legislative power are made by ministers at the Council of the European Union (Council of Ministers), which is generally attended by representatives of ministerial rank although they can be replaced by delegates.

The position of a chief negotiator can be traced back under varying names to the first years after the founding of the European Union, including the Intergovernmental Conference (IGC) meetings.

The name was enshrined in an official document since 2005 with the designation of a high-profile group on competition regulation in the chemistry industry that names officially a "Sherpa-Subgroup".

== Examples ==
- In France, Emmanuel Bonne is G7 and G20 sherpa. Previous French sherpas include Jacques Attali, Anne Lauvergeon, Jean-Marc de La Sablière, Maurice Gourdault-Montagne, Jean-David Levitte; Pascal Lamy was a sherpa on the European Commission (representing Jacques Delors).
- In Germany, the canonic name of Chefunterhändler (chief negotiator) is a common second title to another high-profile position. Bernd Pfaffenbach held this position since 2004 being also secretary of state in the Ministry of Economics (since 2005). The title was held before by Horst Köhler (former President of Germany) and Hans Tietmeyer (became later the President of the Deutsche Bundesbank). Since December 2009 the position of G8-Sherpa is held by Jens Weidmann who has been sherpa to the G20 summits before.
- In India, Amitabh Kant is the Sherpa to the G-20. Previous Indian sherpas include Piyush Goyal, Suresh Prabhu, Shaktikanta Das, Arvind Panagariya, Montek Singh Ahluwalia.
- In Italy, Giampiero Massolo has been Sherpa for the G8 in 2008. Fabrizio Pagani has been G20 Sherpa in 2013.

== Sherpa pre-summit ==
During the preliminary preparatory process which takes place in advance of a G7 summit, the leader of a G7 host country conventionally invites representatives from the other G7 participants to send representatives known as "sherpas" to develop the agenda topics and other matters. They often produce communiques which show the current state of negotiations.

Apart from conferences of the sherpas of the head of state there are additional conferences held in specific domains that are routinely attended by other state secretaries in the government—most of the G8 countries have national sherpa teams in the field of foreign affairs (Foreign Affairs Sous-Sherpa) and finance (Finance Sous-Sherpa).

== Sous-Sherpa ==
The term Sous-Sherpa (translates as "under-Sherpa") describes senior officials who serve as deputies to the sherpas in the preparation of multilateral summits. They support the sherpas by gathering information, drafting position papers, and preparing negotiations.

== See also ==
- Spaak method
- BRICS
- G8
- G-20 major economies
