= Gesine Schwan =

German political scientist

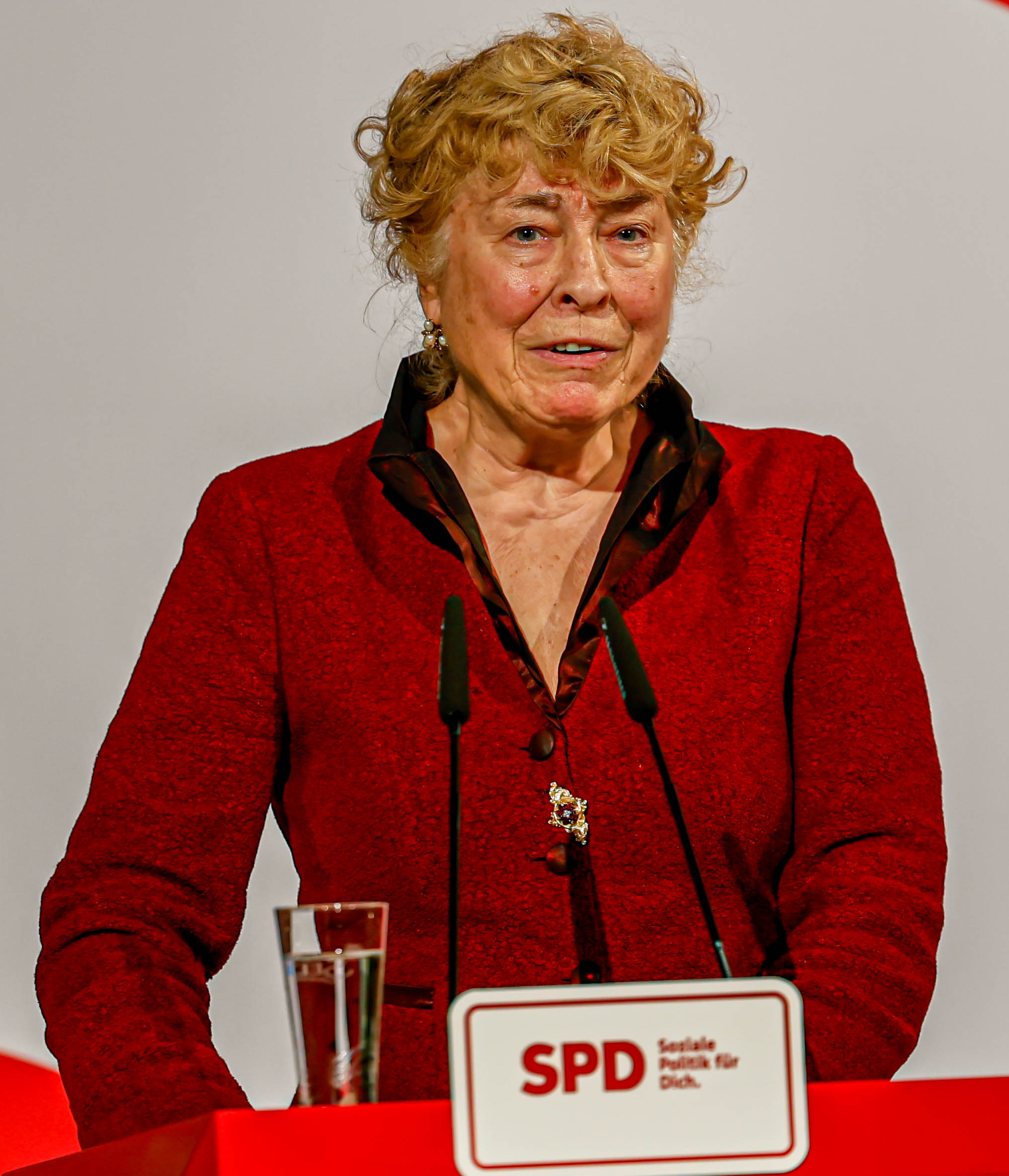
- Schwan in 2023

President of the Viadrina European University
- In office 1 October 1999 – 30 September 2008
- Preceded by: Hans Weiler
- Succeeded by: Gunter Pleuger

Personal details
- Born: 22 May 1943 (age 83) Berlin, Germany
- Party: Social Democratic Party
- Spouses: Alexander Schwan (died 1989) Peter Eigen (m. 2004)
- Education: Free University of Berlin; University of Freiburg

Gesine Schwan (née Schneider, 22 May 1943) is a German political science professor and member of the Social Democratic Party of Germany. The party has nominated her twice as a candidate for the federal presidential elections. On 23 May 2004, she was defeated by the Christian Democrat Horst Köhler. On 23 May 2009, Köhler beat her again to win his second term.

== Personal life ==
Born in Berlin on 22 May 1943, Schwan was baptized in the Roman Catholic faith as the daughter of Oberschulrat (Senior School Inspector) Hans R. Schneider. During the Third Reich dictatorship her parents were members of the passive resistance, offering protection to a Jewish girl by hiding her. After World War II, the family engaged actively in the reconciliation of Polish–German relations.

In 1969, Schwan married her first husband, Professor Alexander Schwan, with whom she had two children and who died in 1989. In 2004, Gesine Schwan celebrated her second wedding with longtime companion Peter Eigen in Berlin. He is a former World Bank manager as well as a founder and current Chair of the Advisory Council of Transparency International. Schwan is very engaged in German and Polish mutual understanding and therefore supports, in numerous ways, the work of the Freya von Moltke Stiftung for the New Kreisau. She has given numerous presentations on this topic.

== Academic life ==
=== Education ===
In 1962, Schwan graduated (Abitur) from the bilingual Französisches Gymnasium, a German-French secondary school in Berlin. In the same year, she began her studies in history, philosophy, romance languages, and political science at the Free University of Berlin and later at University of Freiburg.

=== Early career ===
After research stays in Warsaw and Kraków, she obtained her Ph.D. in 1970 from FU Berlin for a dissertation on the Polish philosopher Leszek Kołakowski. After that, she became assistant professor at the same university. Here, she continued her works on the critique of Marx for which she received the habilitation in 1975.

=== Professorship ===
Schwan was appointed full professor at the Department of Political Science at FU Berlin in 1977. At the time, her research fields encompassed political theory, philosophy, psychology, and culture as well as theories of democracy and socialism. In 1980/81, she had a research stay at the Wilson Center for Scholars in the USA; another research stay in 1984 at the Robinson College at Cambridge University; in 1998, she was visiting professor at the New School for Social Research in New York. From 1993 to 1995, she was dean of the Political Science Faculty at FU Berlin.

In 1999, Gesine Schwan competed for the post of president of FU Berlin, but was defeated by Peter Gaehtgens. In the same year, she was elected as the president of Viadrina European University in Frankfurt (Oder).

== Political career ==
Schwan belongs to the German tradition of social democratic opposition to Karl Marx's theories. In September 1974, she was one of the founding members of the Seeheimer Kreis, a conservative think tank within the SPD. She became a member of the SPD Grundwertekommission (Commission for Fundamental Values) in 1977. In 1984, she was removed from this position after criticizing the party's Ostpolitik as cooperating too closely with communist governments, while not engaging enough with dissidents. Rather she sought for support and dialog with those Eastern Europeans who would dare to criticize their governments. Schwan was reinstated in the Grundwertekommission in 1996. Since 2002, she has presided over the German-Polish Forum together with Janusz Reiter. In November 2004, the German government under Gerhard Schröder appointed her to the newly created office of the co-ordinator for cooperation with Poland (her counterpart on the Polish side was then Irena Lipowicz). She retained this position when the government changed and became headed by Christian Democrat Angela Merkel. In February 2009, she criticized Schröder for being too uncritical towards Vladimir Putin and too insensitive about Polish concerns about closer German-Russian ties.

On 15 September 2010, Schwan supported the new initiative Spinelli Group in the European Parliament, which was founded to reinvigorate the strive for federalisation of the European Union (EU). Other prominent supporters are: Jacques Delors, Daniel Cohn-Bendit, Guy Verhofstadt, Jo Leinen, Andrew Duff, and Elmar Brok.

=== Presidential elections ===
On 23 May 2004, Schwan was the SPD candidate for the German presidential election. She received 589 votes in the Bundesversammlung (Federal Assembly) but was defeated by Horst Köhler who won 604 votes from the 1205 delegates. On 26 May 2008, SPD chairman Kurt Beck announced Schwan's renewed nomination for the upcoming presidential elections in 2009. Once again she competed with Horst Köhler, who announced his renewed candidacy on 22 May 2008. In the event Köhler was re-elected to a second term over Schwan.

=== Later political career ===
In the 2019 SPD leadership election, Schwan announced her intention to run for the position as the party's co-chair, together with Ralf Stegner.

== Other activities ==
- Einstein Forum, Member of the Board of Trustees
- CARE Deutschland-Luxemburg, Member of the Board of Trustees
- Museum Berggruen, Member of the International Council
- Theodor Heuss Foundation, Member of the Board of Trustees (since 1994)
- Technische Universität Berlin, Member of the Board of Trustees (2018-2019)

== Controversy ==
Ahead of the 2009 presidential election, Schwan was criticized by the Federal Commissioner for the Stasi Records, Marianne Birthler, for statements on the political regime of East Germany. Reportedly, several electors from the Green Party refused to vote for Schwan due to her statements regarding the communist state.

== Bibliography ==
- Schwan, Gesine (1974). Die Gesellschaftskritik von Karl Marx. Philosophische und politökonomische Voraussetzungen.
- Sozialismus in der Demokratie? Theorie einer konsequent sozialdemokratischen Politik, 1982
- Politik und Schuld. Die zerstörerische Macht des Schweigens, 1997. ISBN 3-596-13404-8
- Antikommunismus und Antiamerikanismus in Deutschland. Kontinuität und Wandel nach 1945, 1999
- Schwan, Gesine; Jerzy Holzer; Marie-Claire Lavabre & Birgit Schwelling (2006). Demokratische politische Identität. Deutschland, Polen und Frankreich im Vergleich. Wiesbaden.
- Schwan, Gesine (Spring 2007). "Bridging the Oder: reflections on Poland, Germany, and the transformation of Europe - Part I. Lecture delivered at the German Unification Symposium, October 3, 2006". Bulletin of the German Historical Institute. 40: 39–46.

== Awards and honours ==
- 1993 Federal cross of merits (Bundesverdienstkreuz 1. Klasse)
- 1999 Urania-Medal Award for Particular Activities in the Scientific National Education
- 2002 Commander's Cross of the Order of Merits of the Federal Republic of Germany (Großes Bundesverdienstkreuz)
- 2004 Marion Dönhoff Award for International Agreement and Conciliation
- 2006 Honorary doctor of the European University Institute, Florence

Academic offices
Preceded by Hans Weiler	President of the Viadrina European University; 1999–2008	Succeeded by Gunter Pleuger
