= Caio Koch-Weser =

German businessman and economist

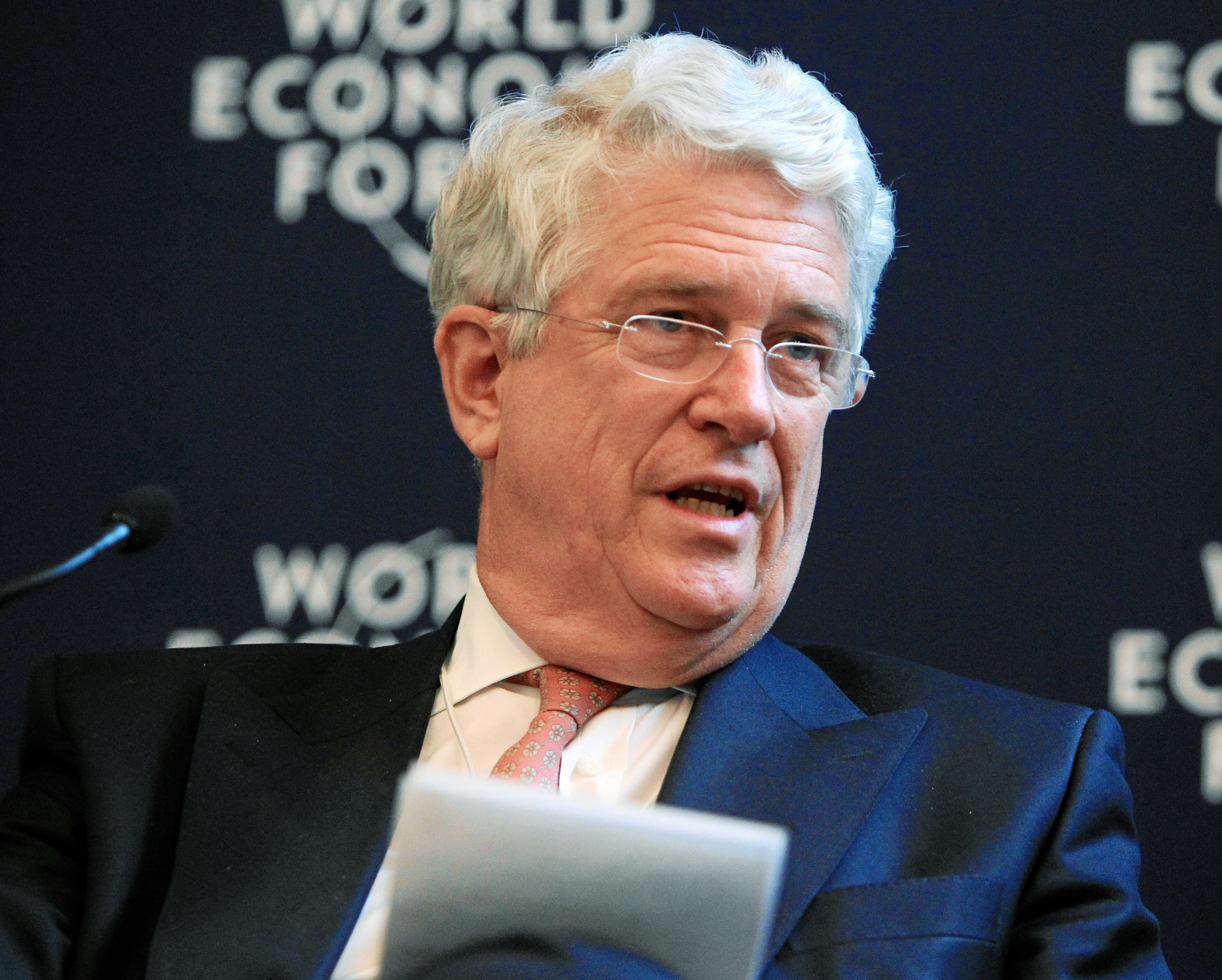
- Caio Koch-Weser at the World Economic Forum Annual Meeting in 2012
- Born: Caio Kai Koch-Weser; July 25, 1944 (age 81); Rolândia, Brazil
- Citizenship: Germany
- Occupations: Businessman; Economist; Civil Servant
- Title: Vice Chairman of Deutsche Bank
- Spouse: Maritta Rogalla von Bieberstein
- Children: 3

Caio Kai Koch-Weser (born July 25, 1944 in Rolândia, Brazil) is a German economist, civil servant and business executive. He was Secretary of State in the Federal Ministry of Finance 1999–2005. Prior to becoming Secretary of State, he served in the World Bank in a number of positions for 26 years, from 1991–1999 as Vice President and from 1996–1999 as Managing Director of Operations. He is now a Vice Chairman and senior adviser with Deutsche Bank.

== Early life ==
Koch-Weser was born and grew up in Brazil, since his parents and grandparents had left Germany due to the rise of Nazism. He is the grandson of liberal politician and former German Federal Minister of Justice and Vice Chancellor Erich Koch-Weser, who had a Jewish mother.

Caio Koch-Weser settled in West Germany in 1961, at 17, where he took his Abitur and went on to study economics, sociology and history in Münster, Berlin and Bonn.

== Career in the World Bank ==
Koch-Weser joined the World Bank in 1973. He served as Personal Assistant to the President of the Bank Robert McNamara (1977–1980), Division Chief for China (1980–1986), and Director of Western Africa Department (1986–1990). In 1990 he was assigned to the Treasurer's Department, and in 1991 he became Vice President of Middle East and North Africa (MNA). As Vice President of MNA, Koch-Weser was responsible for improving economic relations between the Middle East and North Africa. In November 1995, the Middle Eastern markets and income were declining, and Koch-Weser explained this was because the Middle East "squandered their potential during good times and then reaped the whirlwind in bad ones". He was also appointed one of the Managing Directors of the World Bank in 1996. During his career in the World Bank, he mostly lived in Washington D.C. but also worked in Asia, Latin America, Eastern Europe, the Middle East, and Africa.

== Secretary of State in the Ministry of Finance ==
In May 1999 he was appointed Secretary of State in the Federal Ministry of Finance, and as such the administrative head of the Ministry and deputy of the Federal Minister of Finance. Despite being appointed to a political position in the SPD government, he is not member of a political party.

He was nominated by the German government for the post as head of the International Monetary Fund (IMF) in 2000, but because he was rejected by the United States, the German government eventually nominated Horst Köhler, who was elected. Horst Köhler, one of Koch-Weser's predecessors as Secretary of State in the Ministry of Finance, would later become President of Germany.

== After politics ==
After the 2005 elections and the formation of a new government under Chancellor Angela Merkel, Koch-Weser decided to leave his post at the Ministry of Finance, and was appointed to the board of Deutsche Bank, as Vice Chairman, in January 2006. He is also active as an advisor for major customers of the bank on financial, economic and strategic developments, and represents the bank in key public forums worldwide. He has been based in London since 2006.

=== Corporate boards ===
- BG Group, Non-Executive Member of the Board of Director (2010-2016)

=== Non-profit organizations ===
- Blum Center for Developing Economies at the University of California, Berkeley, Member of the Board of Trustees
- Chatham House, Member of the Panel of Senior Advisers
- World Resources Institute (WRI), Member of the Board
- Global Commission on the Economy and Climate (NCE), Member of the Board
- Centre for European Reform (CER), Member of the Board
- European Climate Foundation, Chair of the Board (2013-2018)
- Bertelsmann Stiftung, Member of the Advisory Board (since 1998), Member of the Board of Trustees (until 2007)
- World Economic Forum, Member of the Board
- Bruegel, Member of the Board

== Personal life ==
He is married to Maritta Rogalla von Bieberstein, of the noble Rogalla von Bieberstein family. They have 3 children.

Political offices
Preceded by Heribert Zitzelsberger	Secretary of State in the Federal Ministry of Finance; 1999–2005	Succeeded by Volker Halsch
