= 2009 German presidential election =

13th presidential election of the Federal Republic of Germany

- 23 May 2009
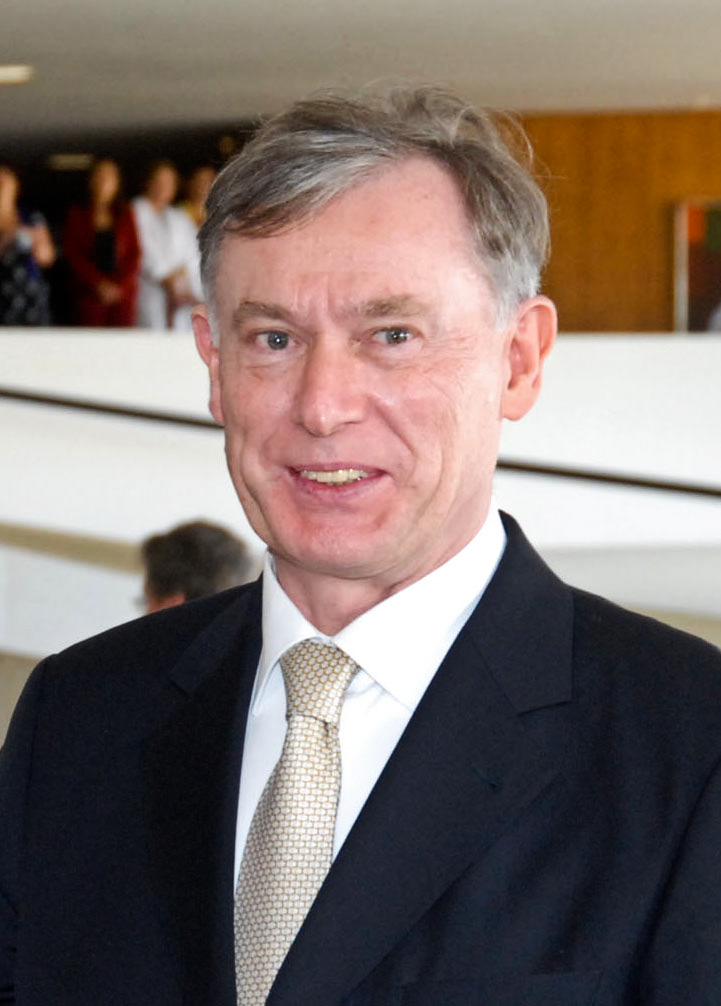

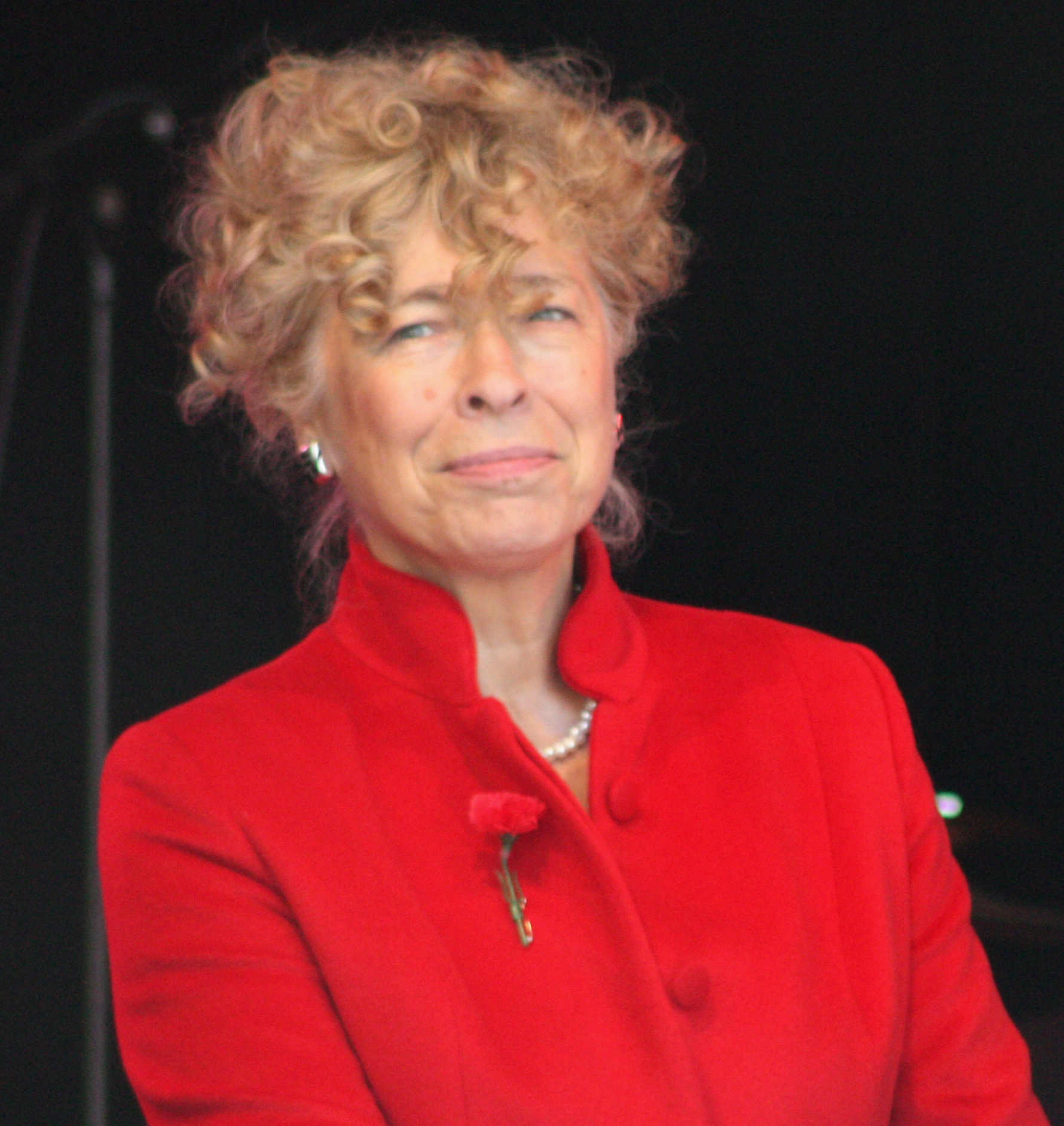

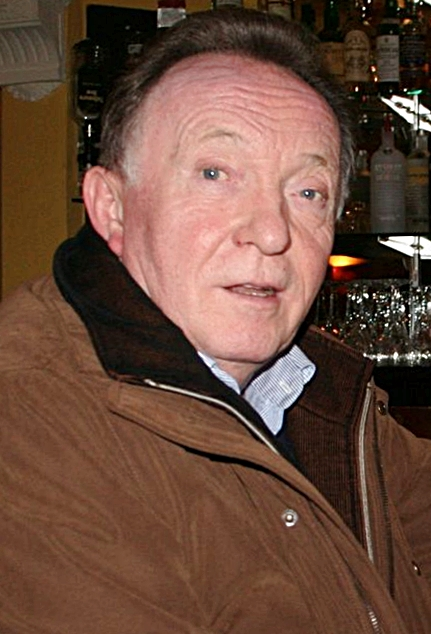
Nominee	Horst Köhler	Gesine Schwan	Peter Sodann
Party	CDU	SPD	Left
Electoral vote	613	503	91
Percentage	50.08%	41.09%	7.43%
Nominators	CDU/CSU, FDP, FW	SPD, Grüne, SSW	Die Linke
President before election
Horst Köhler
CDU/CSU
Elected President
Horst Köhler
CDU/CSU

An indirect presidential election (officially the 13th Federal Convention) was held in Germany on 23 May 2009. The president of Germany is elected by the Federal Convention, which is made up of the members of the Bundestag and an equal number of members elected by the state parliaments.

The incumbent Horst Köhler (supported by CDU/CSU and FDP) stood for reelection and faced Gesine Schwan (supported by SPD and Alliance '90/The Greens).

The Left (successor of the Party of Democratic Socialism) indicated they might be prepared to support Schwan if the SPD agreed to be open to cooperation with the Left on the federal level, but ultimately decided they would present their own candidate. The party nominated party activist and TV actor Peter Sodann on 14 October 2008; and it was left undecided whether the party would support Schwan if Sodann was eliminated after the first round of voting.

Frank Rennicke was nominated as the joint candidate of the far-right parties NPD and DVU.

Following the Hesse state elections in January 2009, which strengthened CDU and FDP, and the Free Voters' promise to support Köhler, his reelection was seen as likely; however, CDU/CSU, FDP and Free Voters only had a slim majority in the Federal Assembly (50.16%), which made the election very competitive. In the end, Köhler was reelected in the first round of voting by 613 votes, which was exactly the minimum number of votes necessary. His nearest rival's, Social Democrat Gesine Schwan, received 503 votes making a second round unnecessary. It has been seen by some as an important indicator for the federal elections in September.

== Composition of the electoral assembly ==
Party	Seats	%
CDU/CSU	497	40.6%
SPD	418	34.2%
FDP	107	8.7%
The Greens	95	7.8%
The Left	90	7.4%
Bavarian Free Voters	10	0.8%
NPD	3	0.2%
DVU	1	0.1%
SSW	1	0.1%
non-faction members of the Bundestag	2	0.2%
	1,224	

== Results ==
23 May 2009
Candidates	Votes	%	Parties
Horst Köhler	613	50.08	CDU/CSU, FDP, FW
Gesine Schwan	503	41.09	SPD, The Greens, SSW
Peter Sodann	91	7.43	Die Linke
Frank Rennicke	4	0.33	NPD, DVU
Abstention	10	0.82	-
Invalid	2	0.16	-
Not present	1	0.08	-
Total of cast votes	1223	99.92	-
Total votes	1224	100.00	-
