= Horst Köhler =

President of Germany from 2004 to 2010

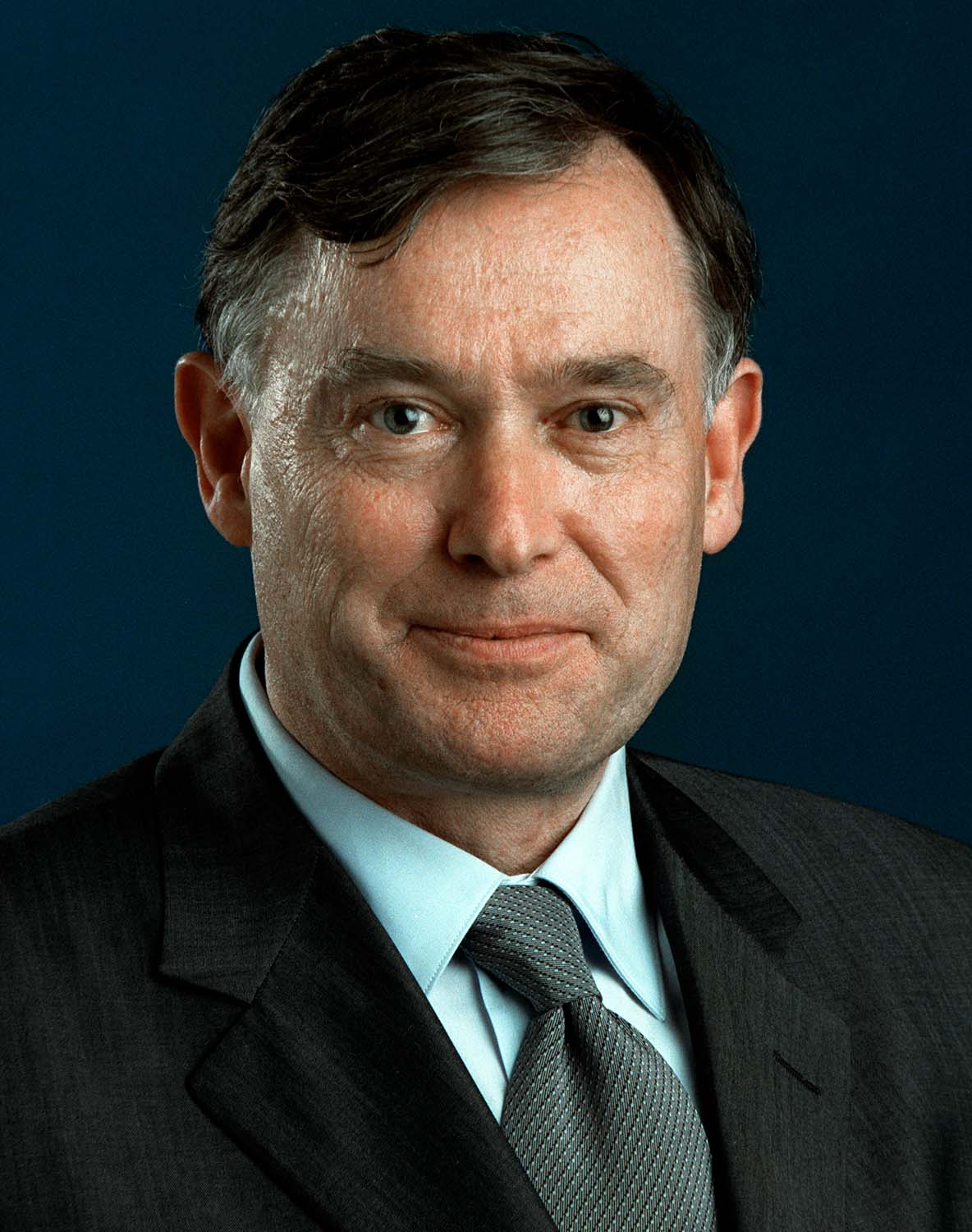
- Köhler in 2004

President of Germany
- In office 1 July 2004 – 31 May 2010
- Chancellor: Gerhard Schröder; Angela Merkel
- Preceded by: Johannes Rau
- Succeeded by: Christian Wulff (Note: Jens Böhrnsen served as acting president from Köhler's resignation until Wulff's election.)

Managing Director of the International Monetary Fund
- In office 1 May 2000 – 4 March 2004
- First Deputy: Stanley Fischer; Anne Osborn Krueger
- Preceded by: Michel Camdessus
- Succeeded by: Rodrigo Rato

President of the European Bank for Reconstruction and Development
- In office September 1998 – April 2000
- Preceded by: Jacques de Larosière
- Succeeded by: Jean Lemierre

President of the German Savings Banks Association
- In office 1993–1998
- Preceded by: Helmut Geiger
- Succeeded by: Dietrich H. Hoppenstedt

State Secretary in the Ministry of Finance
- In office 1990–1993 Serving with Peter Klemm, Franz-Christoph Zeitler
- Chancellor: Helmut Kohl
- Minister: Theo Waigel
- Preceded by: Hans Tietmeyer (1989)
- Succeeded by: Gert Haller

Personal details
- Born: 22 February 1943 Heidenstein, General Government (now Skierbieszów, Poland)
- Died: 1 February 2025 (aged 81) Berlin, Germany
- Party: Christian Democratic Union (1981–2025)
- Spouse: Eva Bohnet (m. 1969)
- Children: 2
- Education: University of Tübingen
- Website: Official website

Horst Köhler (German: [ˈhɔʁst ˈkøːlɐ]; 22 February 1943 – 1 February 2025) was a German politician who served as President of Germany from 2004 to 2010. As the candidate of the two Christian Democratic sister parties (the CDU, of which he was a member, and the CSU) and also candidate of the liberal FDP, Köhler was elected to his first five-year term by the Federal Convention on 23 May 2004 and was subsequently inaugurated on 1 July 2004. He was reelected to a second term on 23 May 2009. Just a year later, on 31 May 2010, he resigned from his office in a controversy over a comment on the role of the German Armed Forces in light of a visit to the troops in Afghanistan. During his tenure as president, whose office is mostly concerned with ceremonial matters, Köhler was a highly popular politician, with approval rates above those of both Chancellor Gerhard Schröder and later Chancellor Angela Merkel.

Köhler was an economist by profession. Prior to his election as president, Köhler had a distinguished career in politics and the civil service and as a banking executive. He was president of the European Bank for Reconstruction and Development from 1998 to 2000 and head of the International Monetary Fund (IMF) from 2000 to 2004. From 2012 to 2013, Köhler served on the UN Secretary-General's High-level Panel on the Post-2015 Development Agenda.

== Early life ==
Köhler was born in Skierbieszów (at that time named Heidenstein), in the General Government area of German-occupied Poland, as the seventh child of Elisabeth and Eduard Köhler, into a family of Bessarabia Germans from Rîșcani in Romanian Bessarabia (near Bălți in present-day Moldova). Horst Köhler's parents, ethnic Germans and Romanian citizens, had to leave their home in Bessarabia in 1940 during the Nazi-Soviet population transfers that followed the invasion of Poland and the Molotov–Ribbentrop Pact, which awarded Bessarabia to the Soviet Union. As part of the Generalplan Ost, they were resettled in 1942 at Skierbieszów, a village near Zamość, Poland (which at that time was part of the General Government). As the Wehrmacht was pushed back and the first parts of Poland had to be abandoned in 1944, the Köhler family fled to Leipzig. In 1953, they left the Soviet Zone – via West Berlin – to escape from the communist regime. The family lived in refugee camps until 1957, when they settled in Ludwigsburg. Horst Köhler hence spent most of his first 14 years as a refugee.

== Studies and military service ==
A teacher recommended that the refugee boy Köhler should apply for the Gymnasium, and Köhler took his Abitur in 1963. After two years of military service at a Panzergrenadier battalion in Ellwangen, he left the Bundeswehr as Leutnant der Reserve (Reserve Lieutenant). He studied and finally gained a doctorate in economics and political sciences from the University of Tübingen, where he was a scientific research assistant at the Institut für Angewandte Wirtschaftsforschung from 1969 to 1976.

== Career in the civil service ==
Köhler joined the civil service in 1976, when he was employed in the Federal Ministry of Economics. In 1981, he was employed in the Staatskanzlei des Landes Schleswig-Holstein (chancellery of the state government of Schleswig-Holstein) under Minister-president Gerhard Stoltenberg.

On 1 October 1982, Helmut Kohl (CDU) became Chancellor of Germany. He formed the First Kohl cabinet. Upon Stoltenberg's recommendation (who was Federal Finance Minister in Kohl's first, second and third cabinets until 21 April 1989), Köhler was made head of Stoltenberg's office in the Federal Ministry of Finance. Köhler rose to Director General for financial policy and federal industrial interests in 1987. In 1989, he became Director General for currency and credit.

== Secretary of State in the Ministry of Finance ==
A member of the CDU from 1981, Köhler was Secretary of State in the Federal Ministry of Finance from 1990 to 1993, and as such, the administrative head of the Ministry and the deputy of the Federal Minister of Finance (Theodor Waigel). In that capacity, he served as a "sherpa" (personal representative) for Chancellor Helmut Kohl, preparing G7 summits and other international economic conferences. As secretary of state, Köhler negotiated both the German–German monetary union and the final withdrawal of Soviet troops from the GDR in 1994. In addition, he was chief negotiator for the Maastricht Treaty on European Monetary Union, which led to the creation of the euro as the Union's single currency.

Köhler also played a central role in organising the enormously expensive privatisation of state businesses (VEB) in Eastern Germany. He organized the Treuhand, the agency charged with selling 11,000 aged and moribund VEBs.

== Career in banking 1993–2000 ==
Between 1993 and 1998, he served as president of the association of savings banks in Germany, Deutscher Sparkassen- und Giroverband.

In September 1998, Köhler was appointed president of the European Bank for Reconstruction and Development, and settled in London, where the headquarters of the bank is located. The EBRD then was facing annual losses of US$305 million, largely due to the 1998 Russian financial crisis. He took stock of the situation, then began to refocus the EBRD's notoriously lax investment policies and tighten up on opulence at the bank itself. At the same time, he was widely reputed to clash with his American vice president, Charles Frank, and other EBRD officials reportedly complained about his temper and management style.

== Head of the International Monetary Fund, 2000–2004 ==
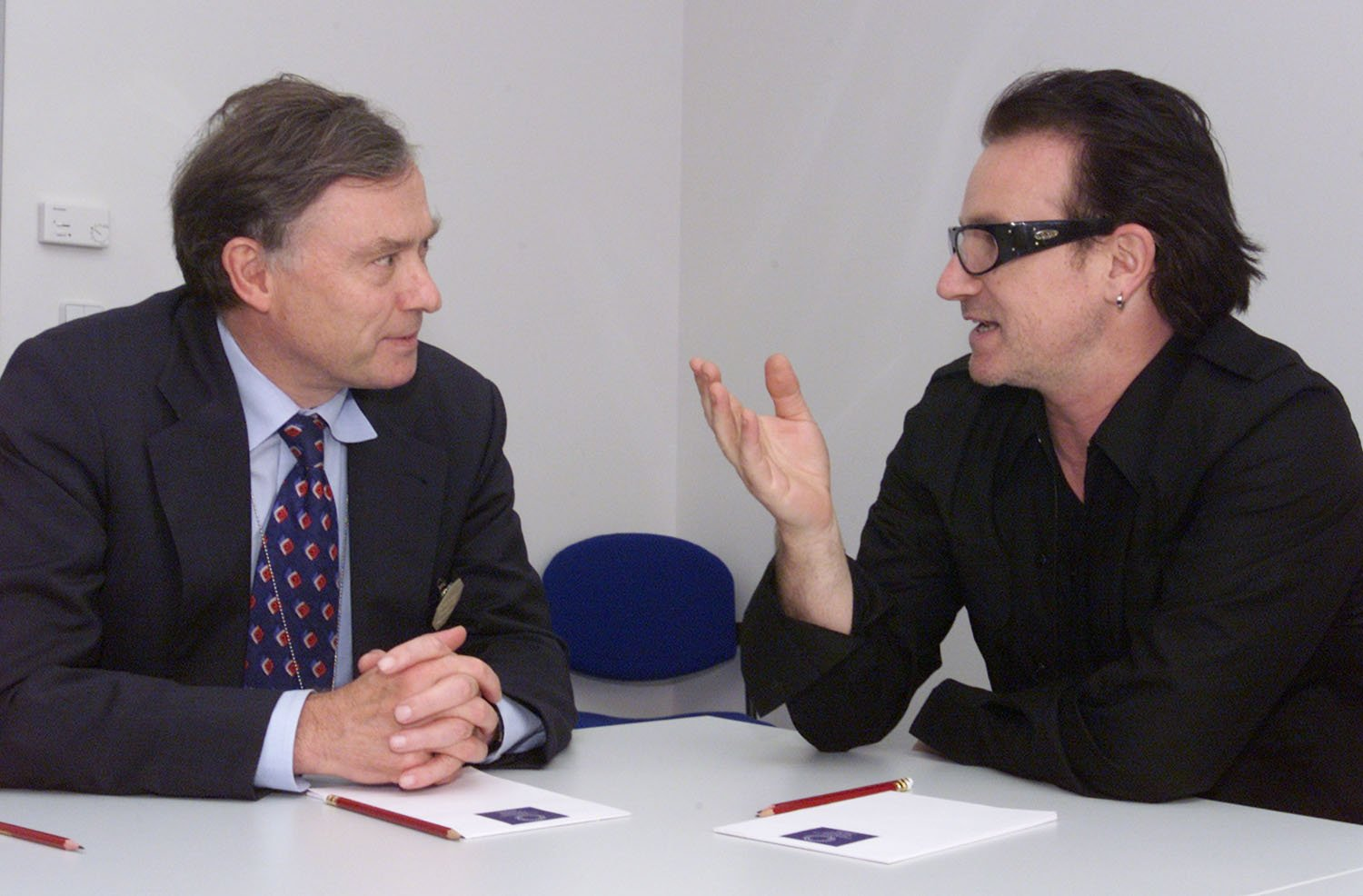
Köhler (l.) as head of the IMF, discussing debt relief for developing countries with the musician Bono

Köhler was appointed managing director and chairman of the executive board of the International Monetary Fund (IMF) in 2000. The government of Gerhard Schröder nominated him after their first nominee, Caio Koch-Weser, was rejected by the United States. Though respected, Köhler was not a particularly well known or prestigious figure in international financial circles. At the time, he was one of three candidates for the IMF position, with Japan having put forward its former deputy finance minister Eisuke Sakakibara and several African nations backing Stanley Fischer.

In one of his first moves at the IMF, Köhler joined British Chancellor of the Exchequer Gordon Brown in hosting a gathering of anti-poverty activists to discuss an international campaign to write off billions of dollars in debts that developing nations owe the IMF, World Bank and other government creditors.

Before entering the office of managing director, Köhler had spent time in Indonesia during the 1997 Asian financial crisis and thereafter cited it as an example of the fund's tendency towards intrusive micromanagement. Instead, he intended to focus the Fund primarily on broad economic management and to reduce overlapping activity with the World Bank. Shortly after taking office in May 2000, he established the Financial Sector Review Group under the leadership of John Lipsky to provide an independent perspective on the Fund's work on international financial markets, In March 2001, on the group's recommendations, he created the International Capital Markets Department, a unit to anticipate and head off financial crises in countries to which the fund makes loans.

In 2001, Köhler recommended naming Timothy Geithner to replace Stanley Fischer as deputy managing director; instead, the US government under President George W. Bush successfully pushed for Anne O. Krueger to take the position.

In order to accept his nomination as presidential candidate, Köhler left the IMF a year before his term was scheduled to end in May 2005. Among his accomplishments were overseeing debt crises in Brazil and Turkey and expanding debt relief for the world's poorest countries. He had less success resolving the continuing debt problems in Argentina.

He lived in Washington, D.C., from 2000 to 2004.

== 9th president of Germany, 2004–2010 ==
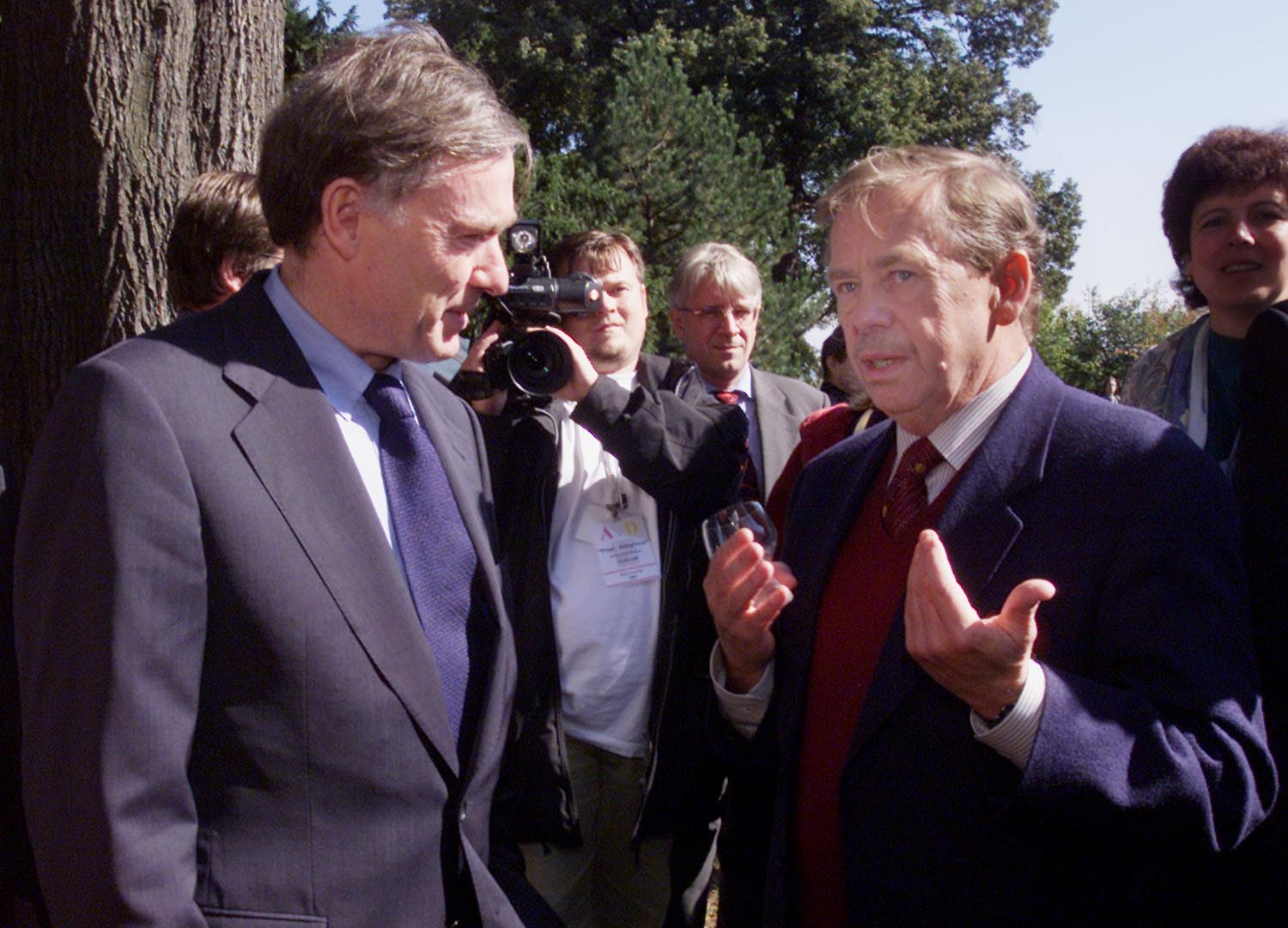
Köhler (l.) and Václav Havel, 2000

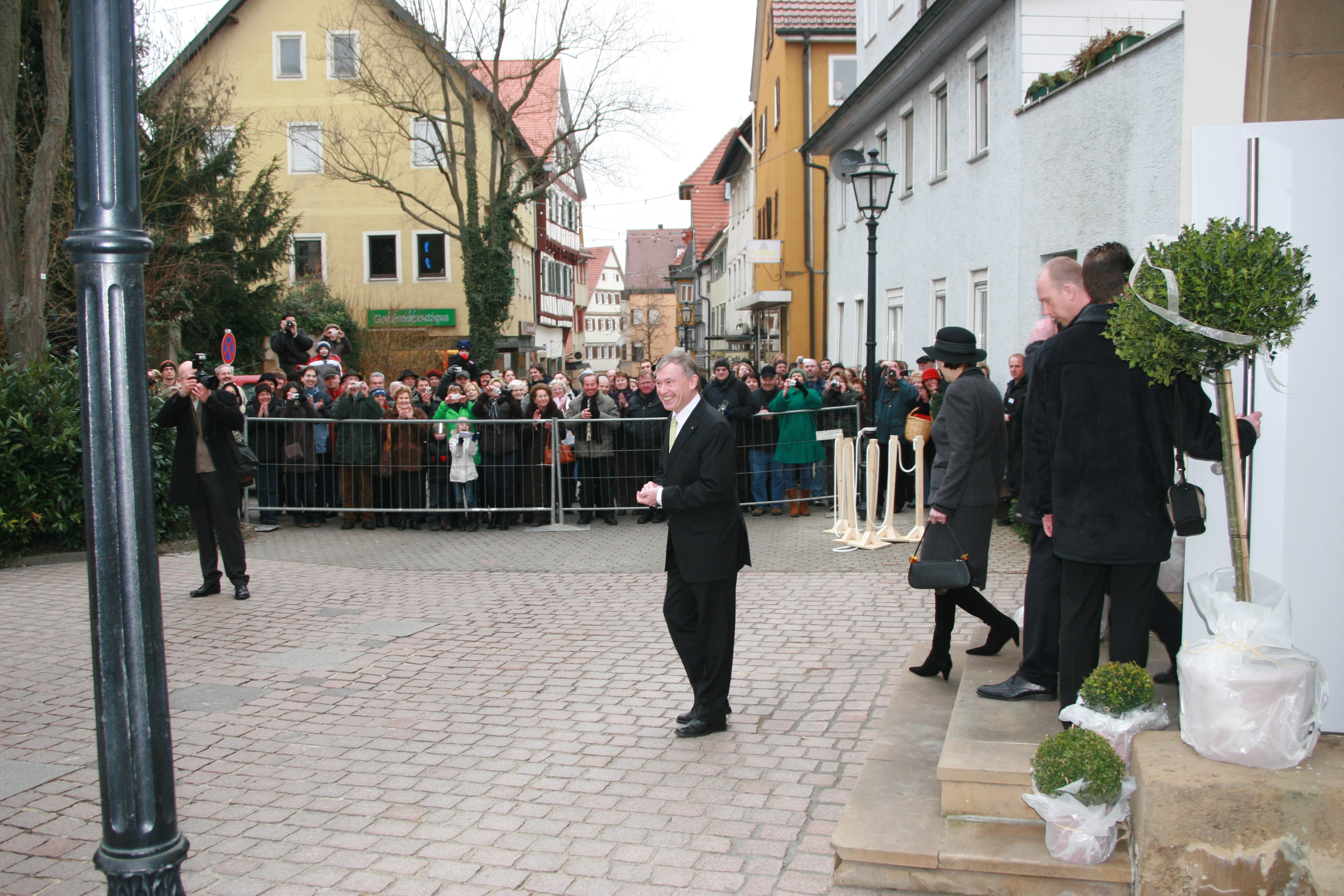
Köhler after unveiling a bronze statue of Theodor Heuss

On 4 March 2004, Köhler resigned his post with the IMF after being nominated by Germany's conservative and liberal opposition parties (CDU/CSU and FDP) as their presidential candidate. As these parties controlled a majority of votes in the Bundesversammlung ("Federal Assembly": an electoral college consisting of the membership of the Bundestag and an equal number of delegates appointed by the legislatures of each state), the result of the vote amounted to essentially a foregone conclusion, but was closer than expected. Köhler defeated Gesine Schwan on the first ballot by 604 votes to 580; 20 votes were cast for minor candidates. Köhler succeeded Johannes Rau as president on 1 July 2004, for a five-year term. Germany's presidency is a largely ceremonial office, but is also invested with considerable moral authority. From 2004 until early 2006, Charlottenburg Palace was the seat of the President of Germany, whilst Schloss Bellevue was being renovated.

Upon his election, Köhler, a conservative German patriot, said that "Patriotism and being cosmopolitan are not opposites." Die Welt wrote, "He appeared an enlightened patriot who genuinely loves his country and is not afraid to say so". Presenting his visions for Germany, Köhler also said that "Germany should become a land of ideas", and emphasised the importance of globalisation, and that Germany would have to compete for its place in the 21st century. Domestically, President Köhler became concerned with the question of how to preserve and create jobs in an internationally competitive environment.

During his presidency, Köhler gained a reputation for regularly voicing his opinion on foreign policy matters. He called for "globalisation with a human face" and became a strong advocate of poverty eradication. In his inaugural speech, Köhler had set his focus on a "fair partnership with Africa" which he described as a question of European self-respect:

In my view, the humanity of our world can be measured against the fate of Africa. Do Europe's self-respect, its foundations, values and history, not require it to play an honest and generous role in Africa?

Throughout his six years as president, Köhler "worked hard to put Africa on the top of Germany's political agenda", according to Deutsche Welle. One of his trademark projects was the Partnership with Africa initiative, which brought together heads of state, entrepreneurs, intellectuals and students from Africa and Europe to create a "dialogue of equals". Through unapologetic criticism of both Europe's negligence of the African continent and of sensitive issues in African politics, including corruption, Köhler gained wide popularity across Africa.

On the eve of his resignation, Köhler presented his book Schicksal Afrika, an edited volume on the continent's future with contributions from 41 authors, including former African presidents Thabo Mbeki and John Kufuor as well as Nobel Prize Literature Laureate Wole Soyinka.

By the summer of 2005, he was Germany's most popular political figure, with an approval rating of 72 percent, according to a poll published in Der Spiegel. In July 2005, he dissolved the Bundestag at Chancellor Gerhard Schröder's request, after the latter had lost a motion of confidence. This led to an early Bundestag election in September 2005.

In August 2005, Köhler attended the memorial ceremony for Brother Roger, the founder of the Taizé Community, an ecumenical monastic community in Burgundy.

In October 2006, Köhler made a far-reaching decision by vetoing the bill, which would transfer Germany's Air Safety Administration Deutsche Flugsicherung into private ownership. The Bundestag passed this legislation but as president, Köhler was authorized not to sign it into law if, in his opinion, it contravened the constitution. In December 2006 he did not sign the Consumer Information Law (which intended to make information collected by public food safety agencies available to consumers), because the constitution does not allow the federal government to instruct municipal authorities. This can only be done by the nation's states. There had only been six previous occasions when Germany's president had chosen to reject bills and in most instances, less important legislation had been involved. His vetoes were the first notable examples in recent German history.

In March 2007, Köhler turned down a politically contentious request for clemency by Christian Klar, a terrorist from the far-left Red Army Faction. His meeting with Klar had drawn protests from conservative politicians, who said Klar had shown no remorse for his crimes. The president also denied clemency to another member, Birgit Hogefeld.

In his 2007 Christmas address to the nation, Köhler urged the government (First Merkel cabinet) to push ahead more quickly with reforms. He was also critical of the introduction of the minimum wage in the postal sector (which had led to the loss of 1,000 jobs at Deutsche Post rival PIN Group), stating that "a minimum wage that cannot be paid by competitive employers destroys jobs".

On 22 May 2008, Köhler announced his candidacy for a second term as president. On 23 May 2009, he was re-elected by the Federal Assembly, and was sworn into office for a second term on 1 July 2009.

=== Resignation ===
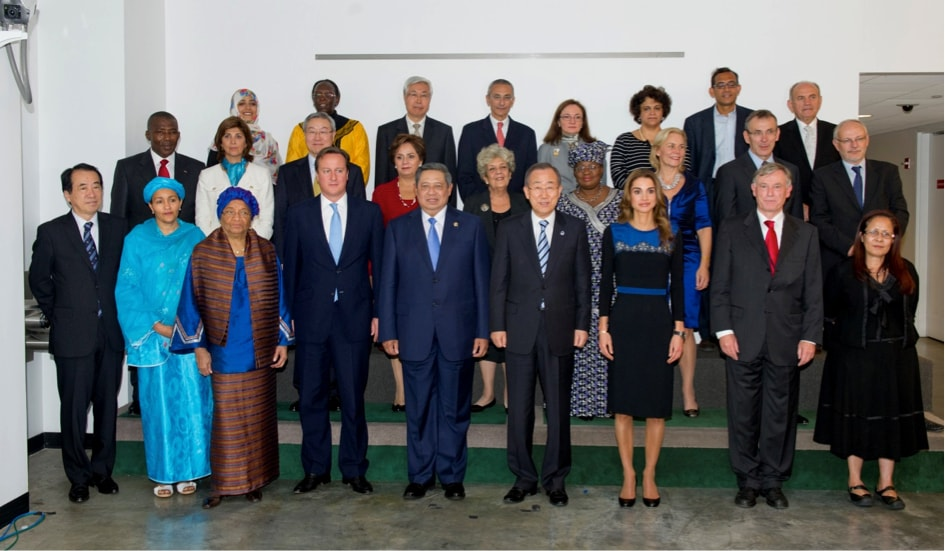
Köhler as member of the UN High-Level Panel of the Post-2015 Development Agenda

On 31 May 2010, Köhler announced his resignation as President of Germany. This came after German politicians criticized comments made by Köhler in relation to overseas military deployments:

In my estimation, though, we – including [German] society as a whole – are coming to the general understanding that, given this [strong] focus and corresponding dependency on exports, a country of our size needs to be aware that where called for or in an emergency, military deployment, too, is necessary if we are to protect our interests such as ensuring free trade routes or preventing regional instabilities which are also certain to negatively impact our ability to safeguard trade, jobs and income. All of this should be discussed and I think the path we are on is not so bad.

— Horst Köhler, Interview with Deutschlandradio, 22 May 2010

After coming under criticism for his statements that Germany's military missions abroad also served to secure trade, critics accused him of advocating the use of "gunboat diplomacy". He subsequently stated that his comments referred to piracy off the coast of Somalia. Köhler stated that there was no substance to accusations that in the interview he had overstepped his formal role by favouring an unconstitutional position. After getting no substantial support in the dispute, Köhler stepped down on 31 May 2010, issuing a statement saying "I declare my resignation from the Office of President, with immediate effect." The resignation was considered a "surprise", and both pundits and opposition politicians labeled it "an overreaction". The following days he was criticized for not being able to handle criticism while being a rigorous critic himself. His unprecedented act of immediate resignation was also considered showing a lack of respect for his position.

As stipulated by the constitution, the powers of the vacant office were executed by the current President of the Bundesrat, Jens Böhrnsen, until Christian Wulff was elected president on 30 June 2010. Wulff himself resigned less than two years later after allegations of corruption were levelled against him. Wulff resigned on 17 February 2012 and was succeeded by Joachim Gauck.

== Post-presidency ==
After leaving office, Köhler continued to voice his opinion on selected foreign and domestic policy matters, most notably on Europe–Africa relations, the global fight against poverty and climate change as well as on the need for a new spirit of global partnership. Between 2010 and 2011, Köhler served as member of the Palais-Royal Initiative, a group convened by Michel Camdessus, Alexandre Lamfalussy and Tommaso Padoa-Schioppa to reform the international monetary system. From 2012 to 2013, Köhler served on the United Nations' High-level Panel on the Post-2015 Development Agenda, which was co-chaired by President Susilo Bambang Yudhoyono of Indonesia, President Ellen Johnson Sirleaf of Liberia, and Prime Minister David Cameron of the United Kingdom. The advisory board was established by UN Secretary-General Ban Ki-moon to shape the global development agenda beyond 2015, the target date for the Millennium Development Goals. The Panel produced a final report with recommendations and thereby contributed to the making of the 2030 Agenda for Sustainable Development, which was adopted by all UN member states in September 2015. Within Germany, Köhler was widely regarded as one of the country's most experienced experts on Africa, although he himself publicly rejected this label, saying in his speech "On the impossibility of speaking of Africa": "The more I learned about Africa, the more I realized how much there still was to learn".

On several occasions, Köhler officially represented Germany as the former president. Köhler took part in Namibia's 25th Independence Day festivities and represented Germany at President Ibrahim Boubacar Keïta's inauguration ceremony in Mali the same year. Beginning in 2016, Köhler co-chaired, together with former UN Secretary-General Kofi Annan, a Special Panel of the African Development Bank (AfDB).

In 2017, Köhler was appointed by Secretary-General António Guterres as his new special envoy for Western Sahara, in charge of restarting talks between Morocco and the Polisario independence movement over the disputed territory. In that capacity, Köhler invited the foreign ministers of Morocco, Algeria and Mauritania as well as the secretary general of the Polisario Front in late 2018 for a meeting in Geneva to broker a settlement over the territory; this marked the first time in six years that the involved parties met for negotiations. In 2019, he left his post on health grounds.

Köhler also worked for numerous charities and non-profit organisations, and held an honorary professorship at the University of Tübingen, his alma mater. After his retirement from German and European politics, he held a variety of positions, including:

- Scope Foundation, Member of the Honorary Board (as of 2020)
- Aktion Deutschland Hilft (Germany's Relief Coalition), Patron
- Club of Madrid, Member
- Deutsche Nationalstiftung, Chairman of the Senate
- Friedrich August von Hayek Foundation, Member of the Board of Trustees
- Hermann Kunst-Stiftung zur Förderung der neutestamentlichen Textforschung, chairman of the Board of Trustees
- Friede Springer Foundation, Member of the Board of Trustees (as of 2011)
- Konrad Adenauer Foundation (KAS), Member of the Board of Trustees
- Wittenberg Center for Global Ethics, Member of the Board of Trustees (as of 2011)
- Emerging Markets Forum (EMF), Co-chair
- African Development Bank (AfDB) Special Panel, Co-chair
- Opera Village Africa, Honorary Patron
- Lindau Nobel Laureate Meetings, Patron of the Horst Köhler Fellowship Programme
- Stiftung Weltethos (Global Ethics Foundation), Member of the Board of Trustees*
- Club of Rome, Honorary Member
- University of Tübingen, Honorary Senator

== Personal life and death ==
In 1969, Köhler married Eva Köhler (née Bohnet), a teacher. They had two children, a daughter Ulrike (born in 1972) and a son Jochen (born in 1977). Köhler was a member of the Protestant Church in Germany. A passionate swimmer, runner and cross-country skier, Köhler chose to spend much of his time in natural surroundings. Köhler lived with his wife in Berlin and Chiemgau.

Köhler died in Berlin on 1 February 2025 after a short illness, 21 days short of his 82nd birthday.

== Honours ==
=== German orders ===
==== State orders ====
- Order of Merit of Baden-Württemberg (2002)

==== Federal orders ====
- Grand Cross Special Class of the Order of Merit of the Federal Republic of Germany (2004) (awarded by virtue of office)

=== Foreign orders ===
- Grand Decoration of Honour in Gold with Star for Services to the Republic of Austria (2003)
- Order of Vytautas the Great with the Golden Chain (19 October 2005)
- Knight of the Order of the White Eagle (2005)
- Knight Grand Cross with Collar of the Order of Merit of the Italian Republic (15 March 2006)
- Grand Cross with Collar of the Order of the White Rose of Finland (2007)
- Knight Grand Cross of the Order of the Netherlands Lion (2007)
- Grand Cross of the Order of St. Olav (15 October 2007)
- Grand Collar of the Order of Prince Henry (2 March 2009)

=== Prizes and awards ===
- Germany: The National German Sustainability Award (2014)
- Germany: Adam Smith Prize for Environmental Economic Policy (2014), Green Budget Germany
- Germany: CARE-Millenniumspreis (2015), in recognition of his service to poverty eradication and work towards a global partnership
- Germany: Global Economy Prize (2017), IfW Kiel Institute for the World Economy

== Notes ==
Diplomatic posts
Preceded by Michel Camdessus	Managing Director of the International Monetary Fund; 2000–2004	Succeeded by Rodrigo Rato
Political offices
Preceded by Johannes Rau	President of Germany; 2004–2010	Succeeded by Christian Wulff
