= Peter Gaehtgens =

German professor of physiology (born 1937)

Peter Gaehtgens (born 1 September 1937 in Dresden) is a German professor of physiology. In 1999, he became president of Free University of Berlin after winning the associated elections against Gesine Schwan. He stayed in this position until 2003, when he was elected president of the German "Rector's Conference" (Hochschulrektorenkonferenz). Gaethgens was a leading proponent of the country-wide introduction of tuition fees at German universities. For this reason, he was heavily criticized in public. On 2 November 2005, during the last year of his tenure, this criticism culminated in an attack by four protesting students who smashed two cakes in his face amid a plenary session at the University of Tübingen.

== Publications ==
Gaethgens most cited academic papers include:

- Goldsmith, H. L.; Cokelet, G. R.; Gaehtgens, P. (1989-09). "Robin Fåhraeus: evolution of his concepts in cardiovascular physiology". The American Journal of Physiology. 257 (3 Pt 2): H1005–1015. doi:10.1152/ajpheart.1989.257.3.H1005. ISSN 0002-9513. PMID 2675631
- Ley, K.; Gaehtgens, P.; Fennie, C.; Singer, M. S.; Lasky, L. A.; Rosen, S. D. (1991-06-15). "Lectin-like cell adhesion molecule 1 mediates leukocyte rolling in mesenteric venules in vivo". Blood. 77 (12): 2553–2555. ISSN 0006-4971. PMID 2043760.
- Ley, K.; Gaehtgens, P. (1991). "Endothelial, not hemodynamic, differences are responsible for preferential leukocyte rolling in rat mesenteric venules". Circulation Research. 69 (4): 1034–1041. doi:10.1161/01.res.69.4.1034. ISSN 0009-7330. PMID 1934331
- Kovacs, Nicholas; Benjamin, Katy; Holland-Thomas, Nicole; Moshkovich, Olga; Nelsen, Linda M.; Ortega, Hector; Schwartz, Ethan J.; Steinfeld, Jonathan; Kirby, Suyong Yun; Klion, Amy; Khoury, Paneez (2020-05-15). "Symptom assessment in hypereosinophilic syndrome: toward development of a patient-reported outcomes tool". The journal of allergy and clinical immunology. In practice. 8 (9): 3209. doi:10.1016/j.jaip.2020.04.069. PMC 7554136. PMID 32416262
