= Pagani (surname) =

Pagani is a surname. Notable people with the name include:

- Alberto Pagani (1938–2017), Italian Grand Prix motorcycle road racer
- Alessandro Pagani (born 1937), Italian Roman Catholic bishop
- Alfredo Pagani (1887–1984), Italian athlete
- Angelo Pagani (born 1988), Italian cyclist
- Daniele Pagani (born 1966), Italian high jumper
- Fabrizio Pagani (born 1967), Italian economist
- Gregorio Pagani (1558–1605), Italian painter of the late Mannerist period
- Herbert Pagani (1944–1988), Italian artist and musician
- Horacio Pagani (auto executive) (born 1955), Argentine founder of Pagani Automobili S.p.A.
- Horacio Pagani (sportswriter) (born 1948), Argentine sportswriter and sportscaster
- Lattanzio Pagani, Italian painter of the late-Renaissance or Mannerist period
- Maghinardo Pagani, Italian condottiero and statesman
- Marcelo Pagani (born 1941), Argentine footballer
- Maurizio Pagani (1936–2014), Italian engineer and politician
- Mauro Pagani (born 1946), Italian musician and singer
- Nello Pagani (1911–2003), Italian Grand Prix motorcycle road racer and Formula One driver
- Nicola Pagani (born 1977), Italian footballer
- Paolo Pagani (1655–1716), Italian Baroque/Mannerism painter
- Rémy Pagani (born 1954), Swiss politician
- Vincenzo Pagani (c. 1490–1568), Italian painter
