= Hans N. Weiler =

American academic

Hans N. Weiler is a Professor Emeritus of Education and Political Science at Stanford University, and a Professor Emeritus of Comparative Politics and former rector of the Viadrina European University in Frankfurt (Oder), Germany.

== Early life ==
On September 13, 1934, Weiler was born in Krefeld, Germany.

== Education ==
Weiler graduated from the Hochschule St. Georgen, Frankfurt/Main, in Philosophy (1956) and went on to study Philosophy, Political Science, and Education at the University of Freiburg/Breisgau, where he graduated in 1960, followed by a stay at the University of London's Institute of Commonwealth Studies and School of Oriental and African Studies. In 1965, Weiler obtained a PhD. in Political Science from University of Freiburg.

== Career ==
In 1962, Weiler became a Research Fellow and Chairman of the Africa Division at the University of Freiburg's Arnold Bergstraesser institute.

That same year, Weiler became Assistant Professor of Education and Political Science at Stanford University (Associate Professor as of 1971, full Professor 1979). From 1974 to 1977, he was on leave as Director of the International Institute for Educational Planning (UNESCO) at Paris.

From 1993 to 1999, Weiler was Professor of Comparative Politics and Rektor of the Europa-Universität Viadrina at Frankfurt/Oder.

== Personal life ==
Weiler is a naturalized U.S. citizen. He is married and has two sons.

== Awards and honors ==
- British Council Postgraduate Research Fellow, University of London, 1960–61
- Scholar-in-Residence, Institute for German Studies, Indiana University, 1971
- Academy Associate (to James B. Conant), National Academy of Education, 1972
- University Fellow, Stanford University, 1979–81
- Claude Eggertsen Lecture, Comparative and International Education Society, Atlanta, 1983
- Research Fellow, Japan Society for the Promotion of Science, 1988
- Fellow, Center for Advanced Study in the Behavioral Sciences, 1988–89
- Research Fellow: Friedrich Ebert Foundation, 1990; Deutscher Akademischer Austauschdienst, 1991
- The Lauwerys Memorial Lecture, Comparative Education Society of Europe, Groningen, 1998
- Commander’s Cross of the Order of Merit of the Republic of Poland, 1999
- Honorary Citizenship, City of Frankfurt (Oder), 2000
- Officer’s Cross of the Order of Merit of the Federal Republic of Germany, 2001
- Honorary doctorate (Dr. phil. h.c.), Viadrina European University, 2002
- “Reformer of the Decade Award”, Centrum für Hochschulentwicklung (CHE), 2004
