= Aspirational Districts Programme =

Indian government initiative

The Aspirational Districts Programme is an initiative by the Government of India implemented by NITI Aayog with the help of various stakeholders to improve the living standards of people in aspirational districts.

== History ==
The Aspirational Districts Programme (ADP) was launched in January 2018 by prime minister of India Narendra Modi. The programme is anchored by NITI Aayog in partnership with state governments and district level administrations.

== List of Districts ==
There are 112 Aspirational districts identified throughout the nation covering minimum of one from each state in India.

State/ UT	Districts	State/ UT	Districts	State/ UT	Districts
Jammu & Kashmir	1. Kupwara; 2. Baramulla	Manipur	36. Chandel	Maharashtra	92. Nandurbar; 93. Washim; 94. Gadchiroli; 95. Osmanabad
Himachal Pradesh	3. Chamba	Mizoram	37. Mamit	Andhra Pradesh	96. Vizianagaram; 97. Visakhapatnam; 98. Y.S.R. Kadapa
Punjab	4. Moga; 104. Firozpur	Tripura	38. Dhalai	Karnataka	99. Raichur; 100. Yadgir
Uttarakhand	5. Udham Singh Nagar; 6. Haridwar	Meghalaya	39. Ribhoi	Kerala	101. Wayanad
Haryana	7. Nuh	Assam	40. Goalpara; 41. Barpeta; 42. Hailakandi; 43. Baksa; 44. Darrang; 45. Udalguri; 109. Dhubri	Tamil Nadu	102. Virudhunagar; 103. Ramanathapuram
Rajasthan	8. Dholpur; 9. Karauli; 10. Jaisalmer; 11. Sirohi; 12. Baran	Jharkhand	46. Garhwa; 47. Chatra; 48. Giridih; 49. Godda; 50. Sahibganj; 51. Pakur; 52. Bokaro; 53. Lohardaga; 54. Purbi Singhbhum; 55. Palamu; 56. Latehar; 57. Hazaribagh; 58. Ramgarh; 59. Dumka; 60. Ranchi; 61. Khunti; 62. Gumla; 63. Simdega; 64. Pashchimi Singhbhum	Arunachal Pradesh	108. Namsai
Uttar Pradesh	13. Chitrakoot; 14. Fatehpur; 15. Bahraich; 16. Shrawasti; 17. Balrampur; 18. Siddharthnagar; 19. Chandauli; 20. Sonebhadra	Odisha	65. Dhenkanal; 66. Gajapati; 67. Kandhamal; 68. Balangir; 69. Kalahandi; 70. Rayagada; 71. Koraput; 72. Malkangiri; 73. Nawarangpur; 74. Nuapada	Telangana	110. Asifabad (Komaram Bheem); 111. Jayashankar Bhupalpally; 112. Bhadradri kothagudem
Bihar	21. Sitamarhi; 22. Araria; 23. Purnia; 24. Katihar; 25. Muzaffarpur; 26. Begusarai; 27. Khagaria; 28. Banka; 29. Sheikhpura; 30. Aurangabad; 31. Gaya; 32. Nawada; 33. Jamui	Chhattisgarh	75. Korba; 76. Rajnandgaon; 77. Mahasamund; 78. Kanker; 79. Narayanpur; 80. Dantewada; 81. Bijapur; 105. Bastar; 106. Kondagaon; 107. Sukma		
Sikkim	34. West Sikkim	Madhya Pradesh	82. Chhatarpur; 83. Damoh; 84. Barwani; 85. Rajgarh; 86. Vidisha; 87. Guna; 88. Singrauli; 89. Khandwa		
Nagaland	35. Kiphire	Gujarat	90. Dahod; 91. Narmada		

== Key Areas of Focus ==
- Health & Nutrition
- Education
- Agriculture & Water Resources
- Financial Inclusion & Skill Development
- Basic Infrastructure

== Champions of change portal ==
In April 2018 the Champions of change portal was set-up by NITI Aayog in partnership with Government of Andhra Pradesh to monitor the progress of the programme in the identified aspirational districts. The delta ranking is the overall ranking of the district. This portal provides the data and comprehensive analysis of key areas of focus of the programme. The ranking is open to public to monitor the performance.

== Aspirational Blocks programme ==
The Government of India announced the Aspirational Blocks Programme (ABP) on 7 January 2023. The initiative is being implemented in 500 Aspirational Blocks across 329 districts in the country, selected by an Inter-Ministerial Committee in consultation with state governments. Prime Minister Narendra Modi stated that the success of Aspirational Districts Programme "became the basis of the Aspirational Blocks programme".

== See also ==
- Champions of change portal
- Aspirational Districts Collaborative portal
