= Pagani Detention Center =

Detention center in the island of Lesbos, Greece

Coordinates: 39.1667°N 26.3333°E

Pagani Detention Center is a detention center in the island of Lesbos, Greece for asylum seekers who arrive by boat from Turkey.

A converted former storage facility in Lesbos, the center was designed for 300 people, but at times housed up to 1,200 asylum seekers in cramped conditions, often lacking in medical care and subject to beatings from the guards, drawing condemnation from Greek and foreign humanitarian watchdogs. On 18 August 2009, 160 under-age refugees, who were detained in a single room and sharing the same toilet, started a hunger strike demanding immediate freedom.

In autumn 2009, after a visit by the Deputy Minister for the Protection of the Citizen, the Greek Government pledged to close down Pagani and other similarly overcrowded centers in the Eastern Aegean Islands. Pagani was closed for 20 days in November. In April 2010, the lower rooms were closed, and only the upper storey remained, accommodating some 30–40 people.
