= Matsyafed =

Kerala State Co-operative Federation for Fisheries Development Ltd.
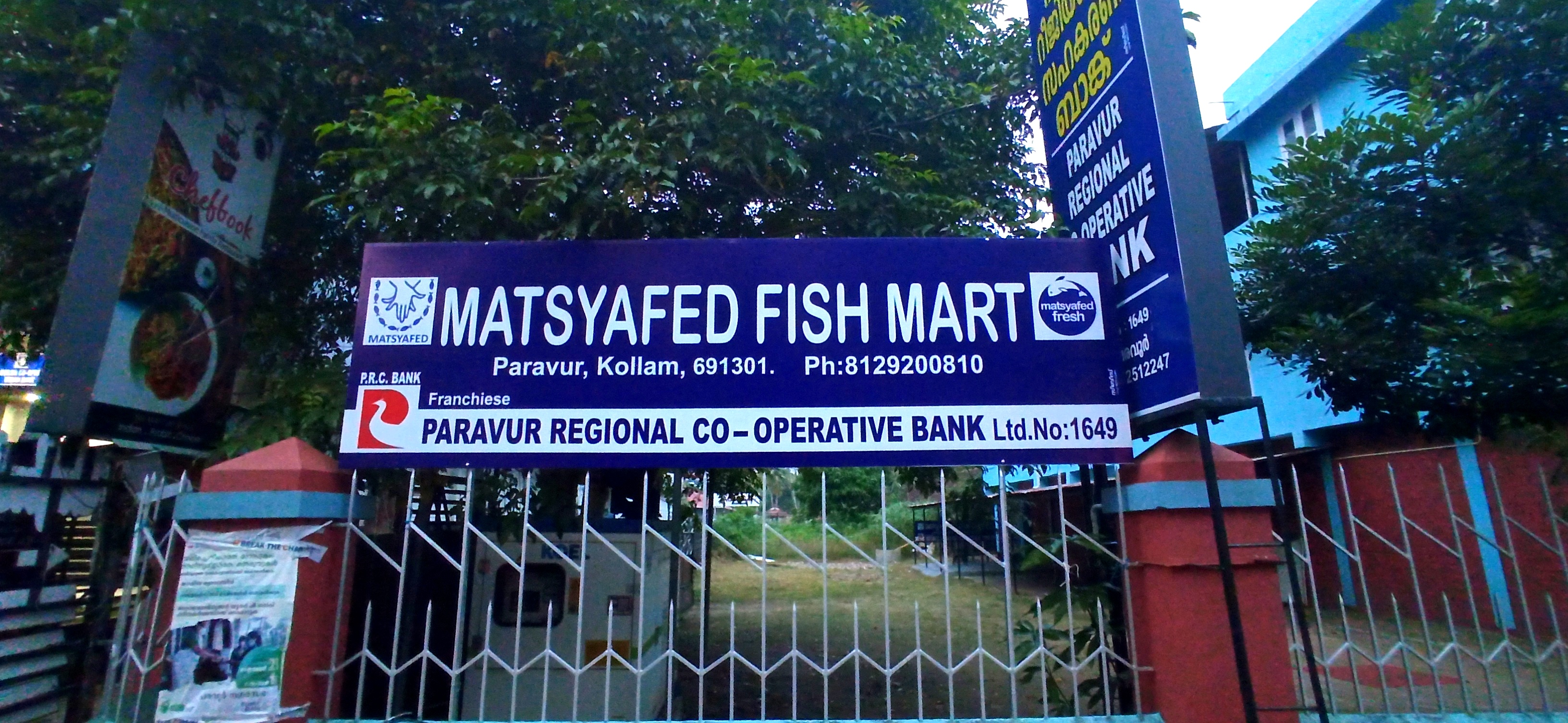
- Company type: Private
- Industry: Fishing
- Founded: 19 March 1984
- Headquarters: Thiruvananthapuram, India
- Key people: Dr. Lawrence Harold (Managing Director)
- Website: www.matsyafed.in

Matsyafed, the Kerala State Co-operative Federation for Fisheries Development Ltd., is the Apex Federation of 654 Primary Fisherman Co-operative Societies spread over 10 districts of Kerala, South India.

There are 332 co-operative societies in the Marine sector, 183 in the Inland sector and 131 women co-operatives. The federation came into existence in 1984. The federation has a district office in each of the maritime districts and one in the Inland district, each headed by a district manager. The district manager has a team of supporting staff co-ordinate and supervise all the activities in the district. The administration and management of Matsyafed is vested with a board of directors having 19 members, of who one are elected from the primary co-operatives, 5 official members and 3 non-officials members nominated by the government. The chief executive is the managing director.

== Activities ==
Matsyafed is engaged in the implementation of multifaceted activities for the welfare development of the fisherman community as detailed below:

- Production oriented activities
- Welfare activities
- Employment generation activities
- Commercial activities
- Women oriented activities
- Extension activities
- Aquaculture activities
- Housing and basic sanitation.

Production oriented activities: Through the integrated fisheries development project Matsyafed has been involved in the process of supplying quality fishing inputs to the traditional fishermen of marine and inland sectors at subsidized rates. To avoid exploitation of fishermen and to ensure better price to the fish landed, beach level auctions of the fish are conducted by the primary co-operatives societies of Matsyafed.

Welfare activities: Eight Vanitha (English: Woman) Buses are operated for transporting fisherman vendors to various routes. The fishermen are covered under the personal accident Insurance scheme for a nominal premium wherein the dependents of those who die in accidents are paid Rs. 1,50 lakhs and for partial disablement Rs. 0.50 lakhs is paid. Community peeling centres are being run in spite of loss to the Federation as an employment opportunity unit for fishermen. Matsyafed has set up 200 small-scale production units of ornamental fishery benefiting 600 fishermen.

Employment generation: Matsyafed has been implementing schemes with the assistance of the National Backward classes finance and Development Corporation since 1995-96 and National Minorities development and Finance Corporation since 1997-98 to provide alternate and diversified employment avenues for the unemployed youth.

Commercial activities: Matsyafed is spearheading many activities by operating nylon net factories, ice and freezing plant, Diesel bunks, Fish Manure plants, Chitosan Plant, Vyasa stores, OBM service centres etc. To ensure timely service to the fishermen at moderate cost, the OBM workshops are set up. The Net Factory ensures the supply of quality fishing nets at moderate cost; timely supply of fishing inputs and accessories are ensured by the Vyasa Stores.

Women-oriented activities: To take up any employment generating activity, fishermen are given loans at very low interest rate.

Extension activities: Since it is felt that the backwardness of the fishing folk is mainly due to the lack of general programmes, health awareness camps, medical camps, etc. are being organized in the coastal area.

Aquaculture activities: To augment the development of fishery, Matsyafed has been managing 3 farms and 4 hatcheries. Fish farm and aqua tourism centre, Vypin are the two of such farms located in Vypin. To check fishery resource depletion in the marine as well as inland waters, fishery conservation measurements have been taken up.

Housing and basic sanitation: Government has entrusted implementation of Housing and sanitation schemes to local bodies from 1997 onwards and hence the residue works are only being carried out. Matsyafed has already completed construction of 33400 houses. In order to give relief to the poor fishermen, Matsyafed had come up with a debt relief scheme amounting to Rs. 9 crores and the government has sanctioned the required amount for this scheme. Based on this, Matsyafed had constructed Adalaths for the Debt relief scheme for fisherman in all the 14 districts and the maximum relief was passed on to the eligible fishermen during this period.

Citation: from Kerala Government Information site

== See also ==
- Kerala University of Fisheries and Ocean Studies
- Fish farm and aqua tourism centre, Vypin
