= Fabrizio Pagani =

Italian economist

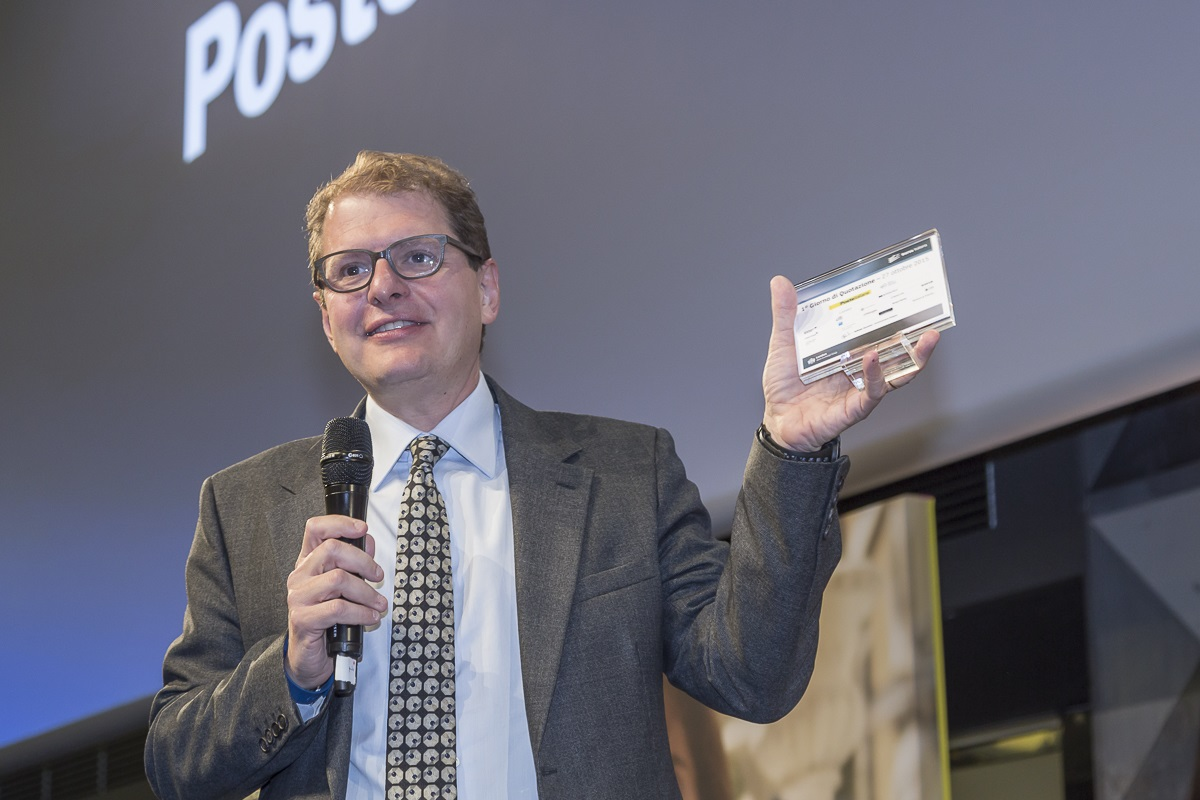
- Fabrizio Pagani on Poste Italiane first day of trading at Borsa di Milano
- Born: January 4, 1967 (age 59)

Fabrizio Pagani (Pisa, January 4, 1967) is an Italian economist and policy expert with a career spanning government, international organizations, and finance. He served as a senior advisor to the Italian Prime Minister and the Minister of Economy and Finance, and held key roles at the OECD, including G20 Sherpa. In the private sector, he has worked at Muzinich & Co. and is now a partner at Vitale & Co. He also teaches at Sciences Po and contributes to public debates on public policies. He is the Treasurer and board member of the Jacques Delors Institute, Paris.

He is the author of "Prometeo e Leviatano. Lo scontro tra mercato e Stato per il controllo dell'economia globale", published by Mondadori in August 2026. He is founder and President of the Foundation M&M - Idee per un Paese migliore, an influential think tank devoted to discuss and promote sound public policies, under the slogan "Policies beyond Politics" (https://fondazionemandm.it/) and President of the Advisory Board of the Bocconi PNRR Lab.

He has been Chief of Staff of the Italian Minister of Economy and Finance, Pier Carlo Padoan and has been Head of the G7 / G20 Office of the OECD and Special Political Counselor to the OECD Secretary-General, Angel Gurria.

Within the Letta Cabinet, he served as economic counsellor and G20 Sherpa of the Prime Minister. He is a public speaker and advises governments on global issues.

== Early life and career ==
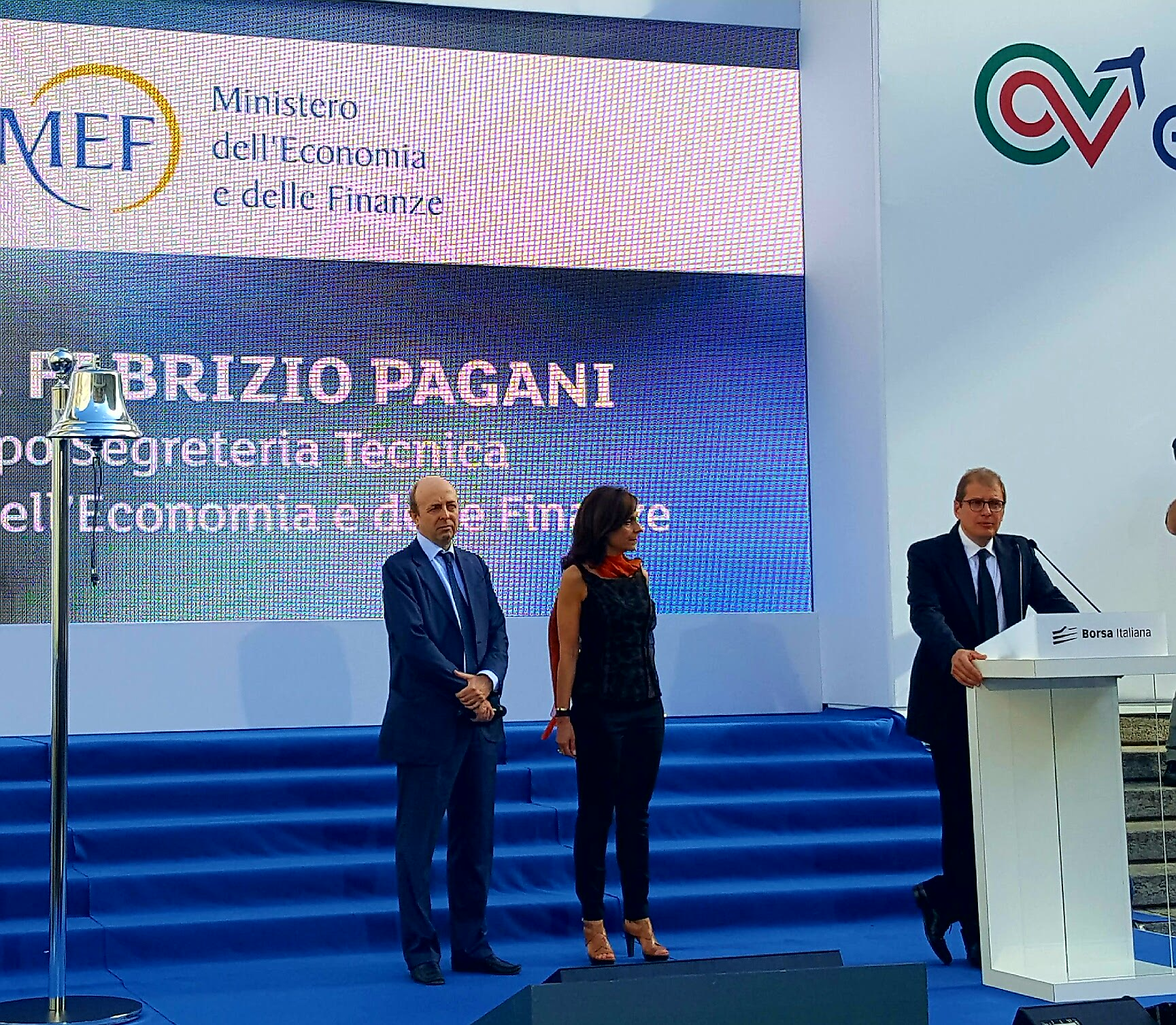
Fabrizio Pagani on ENAV first day of trading at Borsa di Milano in July 2016.

Fabrizio Pagani studied international relations at the Sant'Anna School of Advanced Studies in Pisa and completed his master's degree at the European University Institute. He has been a visiting scholar at the School of International and Public Affairs at Columbia University and at the University of Maryland.

After having held positions at OECD in Paris, he returned to Italy to become Chief of Staff for the Undersecretary of State, Enrico Letta, at the Office of the Italian Prime Minister (2006-208 Prodi II Cabinet).

In 2009, he became Special Political Counselor to the OECD Secretary-General, José Ángel Gurría, and Head of the G7 / G20 Office of the OECD. In this function, he participated for years in all the major international economic summits: IMF, G7, G20.

== Public policies ==
Within Letta Cabinet, he has served as economic counsellor and G20 Sherpa of the Prime Minister. In this capacity, he led the task force “Destinazione Italia”, a plan to attract foreign investment (https://www.mise.gov.it/images/stories/documenti/Destinazione_Italia_20-09-13.pdf).

Fabrizio Pagani has been Head of the Office of Italy's Minister of Finance, Pier Carlo Padoan. Since 2014, for six years, he has been non-executive Director of ENI and Chairman of ENI's advisory board, composed by energy and sustainability experts. He is part of several think tanks and policy units.

In his policy action he has devised policies for the competitiveness of the Italian system, SMEs financing, banking system reform, liberalization, privatization and attraction of investment and of human capital.

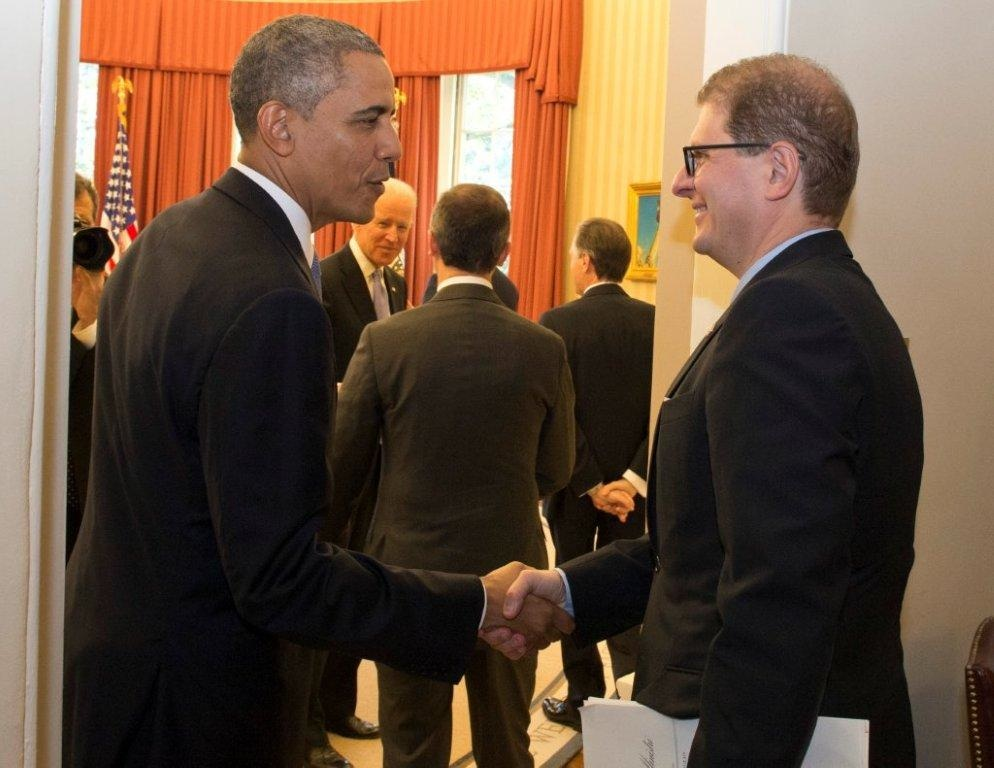
With President Obama at the White House.

As part of Renzi Cabinet and Gentiloni Cabinet economic policy, Pagani created the "Finance for Growth" project which led to the Competitiveness Law Decree (June 2014), "Unlock Italy" Decree (August 2014), to the reform of the banking System (Investment Compact decree – January 2015), and to the Reform of Popular Banks and the Guarantee on Securitization of Bank Non Performing Loans (GACS) (February 2016). Pagani has been at the heart of the implementation of government privatization plan, in particular he worked on Poste Italiane IPO in October 2015 and ENAV listing in July 2016.

He conceived and implemented the project "Italy is Next and Now" to attract financial institutions and human capital in Italy, but in particular in Milan. He has been entrusted with the coordination of the “Milan European Financial Hub” Committee.

== Current positions ==
Fabrizio Pagani is currently working in the financial sector in Italy and internationally and serves in corporate boards.

He is professor at Sciences Po, Paris, Master in International Economic Policy, where he teaches the course: "Economic Policies in Times of Crisis".

He is the Founder and President of the Association M&M - Idee per un Paese migliore, a think tank which elaborates policies according to the motto: "Policies beyond Politics" and chairs the advisory committee of the Bocconi PNRR Lab.

He is a public speaker and contributes regularly to newspapers, TV, and social media on current affairs.

He is the author of several books.

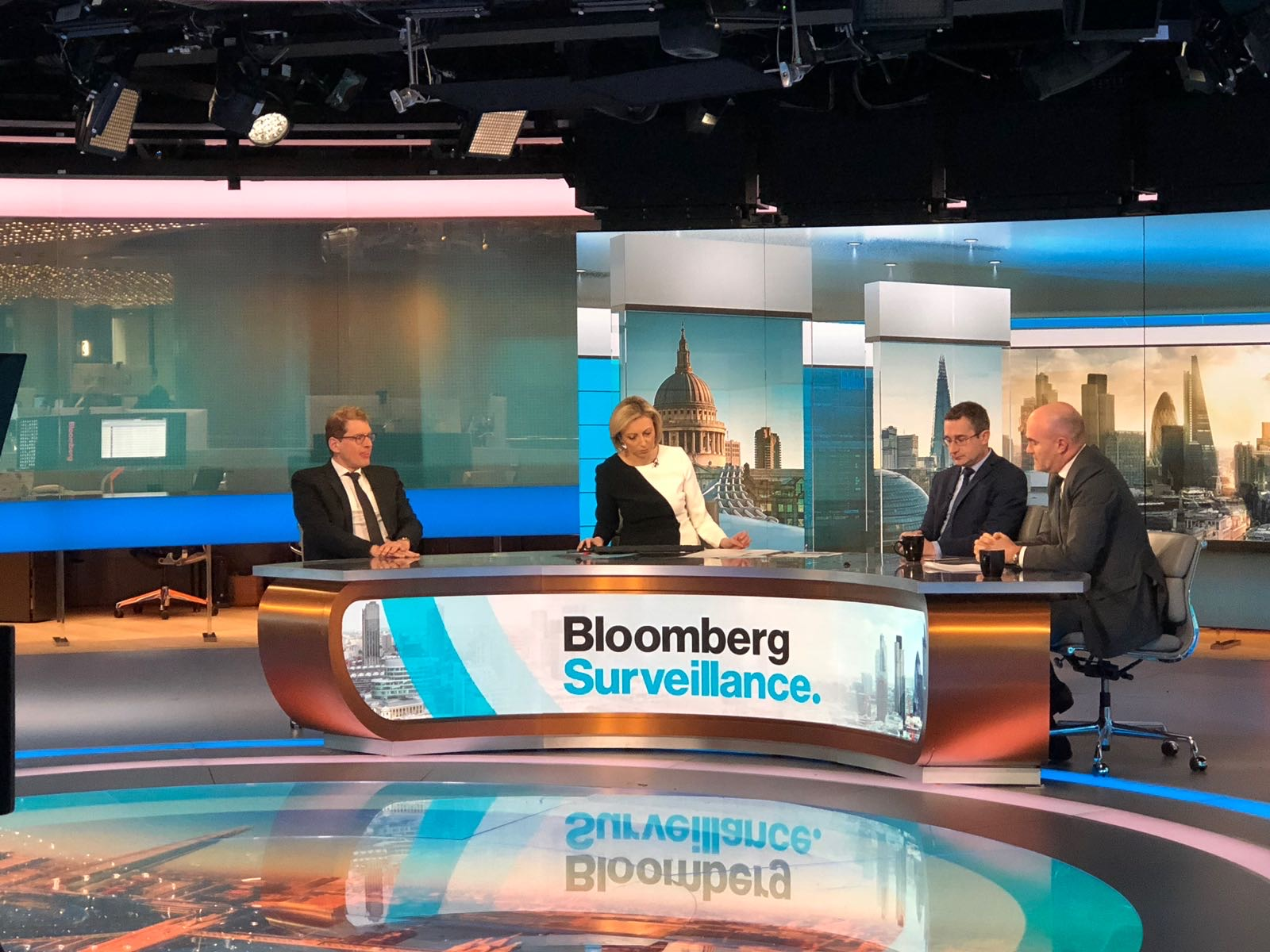
Fabrizio Pagani interviewed by Francine Lacqua, Bloomberg TV

== Works ==
- Andrea de Guttry, Fabrizio Pagani, Sfida all'ordine mondiale. L'11 settembre e la risposta della comunità internazionale, Roma, 2002
- Fabrizio Pagani, Peer Review. An OECD Tool for Co-operation and Change, Paris, 2003
- Fabrizio Pagani, Most-Favoured-Nation Treatment in International Investment Law, 3–5 (OECD Working Paper No. 2004/2, Sept. 2004)
- Fabrizio Pagani, Are Pluriraleral Trade Agreements Possible Outside the World Trade Organisation?, (2006) 40 Journal of World Trade, Issue 5, pp. 797 - 812
- Fabrizio Pagani, The OECD Steel and Shipbuilding Subsidy Negotiations, London, 2008
- Andrea de Guttry, Fabrizio Pagani, Le Nazioni Unite, Bologna, second edition, 2010
- Fabrizio Pagani, Italy's Autumn of Discontent, Breakingviews, 4 September 2018
- Fabrizio Pagani, Emerging Fault Lines: 2019 and Beyond, London, 2019
- Fabrizio Pagani, Finance for Growth: Here and Now...and Next, London, 2019
- Carlo Altomonte, Fabrizio Pagani, Mutual debt is spectre haunting the EU, Reuters Breakingviews, April 2020
- Andrea Garnero, Fabrizio Pagani, Dislocation will be 2021’s buzzword, Reuters Breakingviews, January 2021
- Fabrizio Pagani, Debt, Digital, Climate. Are debt, digital and climate transforming central banking and the broader economy?, London 2021
- Fabrizio Pagani, "Prometeo e Leviatano. Lo scontro tra mercato e Stato per il controllo dell'economia globale", Mondadori, 2026
