= Global Child Forum =

- Website: globalchildforum.org

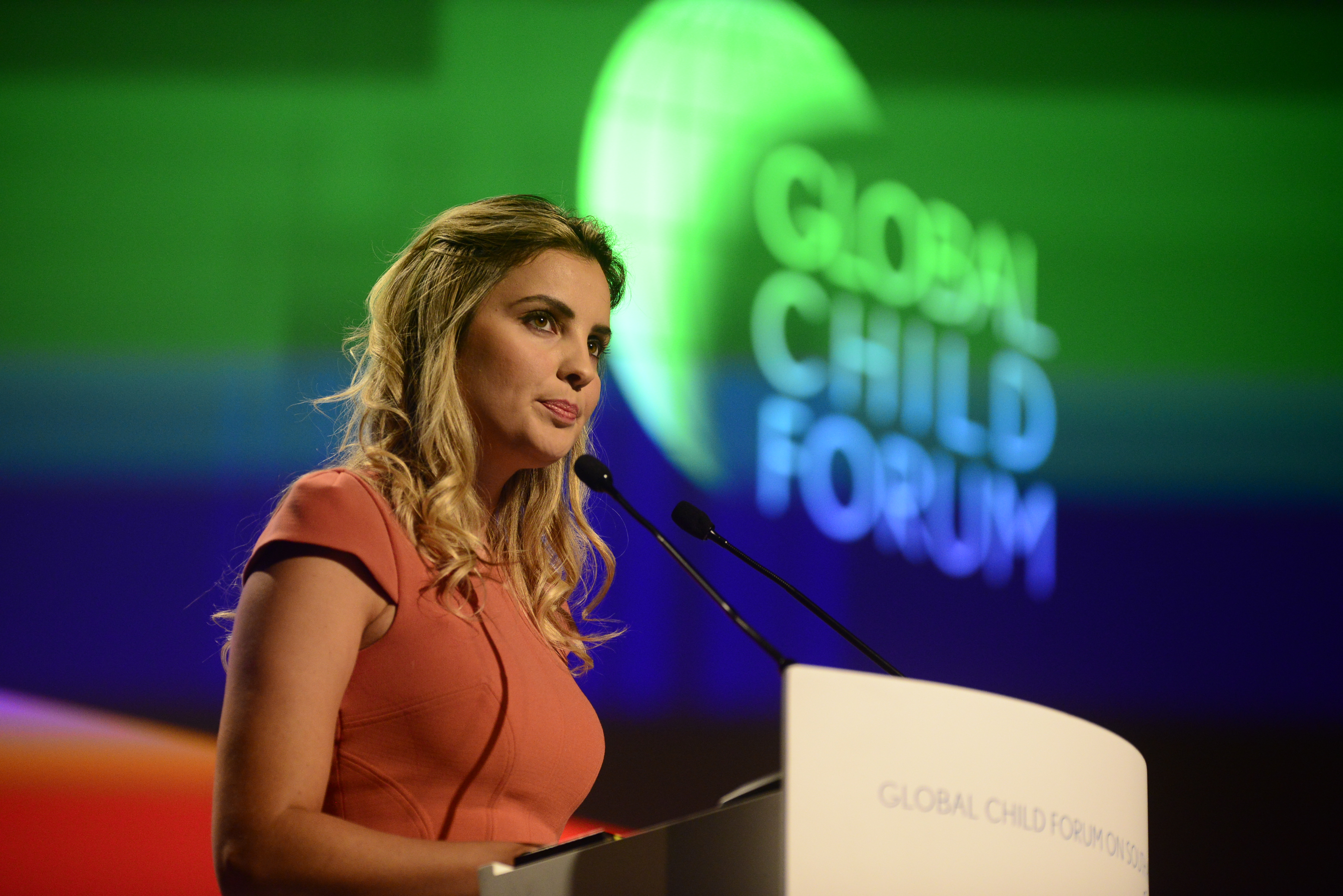
Global Child Forum

The Global Child Forum is a Swedish non-profit foundation, based in Stockholm, Sweden. The organization was founded by King Carl XVI Gustaf and Queen Silvia of Sweden in 2009 in order to advance children’s rights in accordance with the UN Convention on the Rights of the Child. Ekin Ergün Björstedt is the Secretary General since August 2024.

The focus of Global Child Forum is grounded in both the Convention on the Rights of a Child and UNICEF's Children’s Rights and Business Principles and is aimed towards giving business an understanding of how and where their business might impact children.

Each year, in Collaboration with Boston Consulting Group Global Child Forum produces the Corporate Sector and Children’s Rights Benchmark, which compares the practices of approximately 1,800 global companies on children’s rights issues.

== History ==
Global Child Forum was founded in 2009 as World Child and Youth Forum (WCYF). The name was then shorted to Global Child Forum in 2012. Initially, WCYF was intended to be an independent group of decision-makers with the goal of discussing children’s rights and business while using the Royal Palace as a venue. Since then, the organization has expanded to include Regional Forums and conduct its own independent research.

== Forums ==
Global Child Forum is best known for its global and regional forums. Each Forum consists of speaker sessions, panel discussions, and breakout Action Labs. Global forums are held at the Royal Palace in Stockholm and bring together top business leaders, political leaders, academics, and civil society representatives to discuss pressing issues related to children’s rights and business. Regional forums are designed to tackle children’s rights issues faced by that particular region with regional leaders in business, politics, academics, and civil society.

=== Global forums ===
To date, five global forums have been held at the Royal Palace. Approximately 300 global leaders in business, politics, civil society and academia have attended each of the forums. Each event has its own theme on issues concerning children’s rights and business. The latest global forum was 11 April 2018 and discussed investing in every child. During the 2018 Forum, the Global Child Forum Pledge was launched to encourage action amongst participants post-Forum. Additionally, for the first time, the Forum included child participants, Indonesian child laborers from the It's Time to Talk! report on child labour.

=== Regional forums ===
The regional forum is held every year in a new location. The forums brings together approximately 300 regional leaders in business, politics, civil society and academia to discuss issues concerning children’s rights and business within the context of their region. To date, the Global Child Forum has held four regional forums: one in the Middle East and North Africa, Southern Africa, Southeast Asia and South America.

== Notable speakers ==
=== Regional Forum - Southern Africa 2015 ===
- Nkosazana Dlamini Zuma – head, African Union Commission
- Geoff Rothschild – patron, Nelson Mandela Children's Hospital

=== Global Forum - Stockholm, Sweden 2015 ===
- Anne-Birgitte Albrectsen – chief executive officer, Plan International
- Zeid Ra'ad Al Hussein – UN commissioner for human rights
- H.E Shaikha Al Maskari – chief executive, Al Maskari Holding
- Irina Bokova – director-general, UNESCO
- Winne Byanyima- executive director, Oxfam International
- Stefan Löfven – prime minister, Sweden
- Charlotte Petri Gornitzka – director-general, Sida

=== Regional Forum - Southeast Asia 2016 ===
- H.E Le Luong Minh – secretary general, ASEAN
- Thomas Thomas – CEO, ASEAN CSR Network

=== Regional Forum - South America 2017 ===
- H.E Michel Temer – President of the Republic of Brazil
- Clara Lopez Obregon – Minister of Labor, Colombia
- Luis Alberto Moreno – Inter-American Development Bank
- Marta Santos Pais – representative of the UN Secretary General on Violence against Children
- Paulo Skaf – president, Federation of Industries of the State of São Paulo (FIESP)

=== Global Forum - Stockholm, Sweden 2018 ===
- Crown Princess Victoria of Sweden
- Lydia Capolicchio - moderator
- Anna Maria Corazza Bildt - member, European Parliament
- Mikael Damberg - Minister for Enterprise and Innovation, Sweden
- Johan Dennelind - chief executive officer, Telia Company
- Georg Kell - chairman, Arabesque
- Lise Kingo - chief executive director and executive director, United Nations Global Compact
- HRH Princess Laurentien of the Netherlands - founder, Missing Chapter Foundation
