= Sommerlath =

Sommerlath is a German surname. Notable people with the surname include:

- Alice Sommerlath (1906–1997), wife of Walther, mother of Silvia
- Silvia Sommerlath (born 1943), Swedish Queen
- Walther Sommerlath (1901–1990), German businessman

== See also ==
- Sommerlath family
- Sommerlad
