= Ojiambo =

Ojiambo is a surname. Notable people with the surname include:

- Ainea Ojiambo (born 1970), Kenyan actor
- Josephine Ojiambo (born 1961), Kenyan diplomat
- Sanda Ojiambo, Kenyan administrator
