= International Commission Against the Death Penalty =

Independent entity committed to the global abolition of capital punishment

International Commission against the Death Penalty
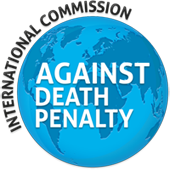
- International Commission against the Death Penalty
- Abbreviation: ICDP
- Formation: October 7, 2010; 16 years ago
- Type: International non-governmental organization
- Legal status: Active
- Headquarters: Madrid, Spain
- Location(s): Secretariat Address: Pl. Marqués de Salamanca, 8, 28006
- Region served: Worldwide
- President: Navi Pillay
- Website: icomdp.org

The International Commission against the Death Penalty (ICDP) was founded in Madrid in October 2010, as a result of a Spanish initiative. ICDP is an independent body composed of 25 Commissioners of high standing who have experience in international law and human rights, and are committed to achieving the universal abolition of capital punishment. Their experience, background, geographical representation and personal involvement in abolishing the death penalty enables them to engage with senior officials from different countries.

The work of ICDP is varied: letters and statements about specific cases are issued urging states not to carry out executions and condemning executions carried out. ICDP organizes and attends meetings and events to promote the abolition of the death penalty.

== Support Group ==
The Commission is supported and funded by a geographically diverse group of 24 countries committed to the abolition of the death penalty.They are united in opposing capital punishment in all circumstances, and urge for the immediate establishment of a universal moratorium on executions as a step towards total abolition of the death penalty.

=== Global Presence ===
The map below illustrates the worldwide distribution of the ICDP Support Group member states and the location of its Secretariat in Madrid.

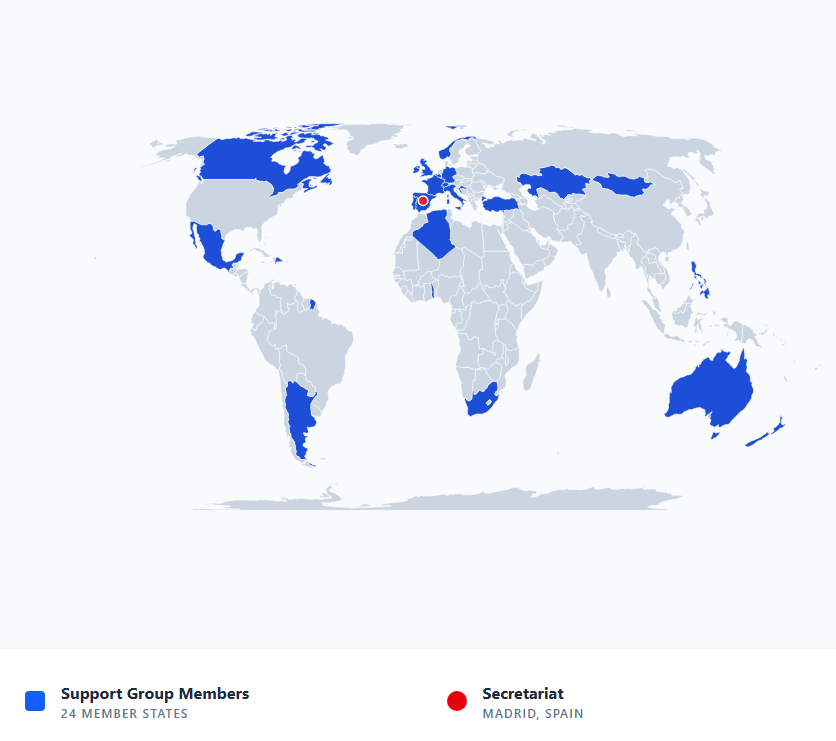
Map representing member states

Region	Member Countries
Africa	Algeria, South Africa, Togo
Americas	Argentina, Canada, Dominican Republic, Mexico
Asia-Pacific	Australia, Kazakhstan, Mongolia, New Zealand, Philippines
Europe	Belgium, Croatia, France, Germany, Ireland, Italy, Norway, Portugal, Spain, Switzerland, Turkey, United Kingdom

=== Presidencies ===
The group has been coordinated by the following countries in recent years:

- 2010–2011: Spain
- 2011–2012: Switzerland
- 2012–2013: Norway
- 2013–2014: Argentina
- Current: Spain

== ICDP Commissioners ==
- President and Vice-Presidents
      - Ibrahim Najjar (Lebanon). Former Minister of Justice.
      - Navanethem "Navi" Pillay (South Africa). Former UN High Commissioner for Human Rights and well-known judge in the ICC and President of the International Criminal Tribunal of Rwanda.
      - Ruth Dreifuss (Switzerland). Former President and Minister of Home Affairs of the Swiss Confederation.
    - Commissioners:
      - Barbara Lochbihler (Germany). Former member of the UN Committee on enforced Disappearances; former Chair and Vice-Chair of the Subcommittee on Human Rights, the Foreign Affairs Committee’s delegation on UN-EU relations and the Iran delegation at the European Parliament; former Secretary General of Amnesty International Germany and former Secretary General of the Women’s International league for Peace and Freedom (WILPF, Geneva)
      - Dannel Patrick Malloy (United States of America): Former Governor of Connecticut, former prosecutor for the Assistant District Attorney in Brooklyn, former Mayor of Stamford. Current Chancellor of the University of Maine System.
      - Enda Kenny (Ireland). Former Taoiseach (Ireland’s Prime Minister), Minister for Education and Tourism and Trade, Leader of Fine Gael, Vice President of the European Peoples’ Party.
      - Gloria Macapagal Arroyo (Philippines). Former President of the Philippines.
      - Hanne Sophie Greve (Norway). Steering Committee Member. A judge and Vice President of the High Court for Western Norway and has served as a judge at the European Court of Human Righs
      - Helen Clark (New Zealand). Former Administrator of the UN Development Program; former Prime Minister of New Zealand
      - Horacio Verbitsky (Argentina): Journalist and writer, current member of the Board of Directors of Human Rights Watch/ America and chair of the Center for Legal and Social Studies (CELS).
      - Ioanna Kuçuradi (Turkey). UNESCO Chairperson of the Philosophy and Human Rights Department and Director of the Centre of Research and Implementation of Human Rights in Maltepe University (Turkey).
      - Ivan Šimonović (Croatia): Member of the UN Human Rights Committee; former Permanent Representative of Croatia to the United Nations in New York; former Professor at the Faculty of law at the University of Zagreb; Former Assistant Secretary-General for Human Rights; former Minister of Justice of Croatia; former Deputy Minister in the Ministry of Foreign Affairs.
      - Manuela Carmena (Spain). Former judge and Mayor of Madrid (2015–2019); member of the UN Working Group on Arbitrary Detention (2003–2009), serving as Chairperson-Rapporteur in 2008; long-standing advocate for human rights and judicial reform; co-founder of the Atocha labour law firm; appointed Commissioner of the International Commission against the Death Penalty (ICDP).
      - Marc Baron Bossuyt (Belgium). Former member of the UN Committee on the Elimination of Racial Discrimination; former Member of the Permanent Court of Arbitration; former Judge and President of the Belgian Constitutional Court; former Chairperson of the UN Commission and the UN Sub-Commission on Human Rights; author of the Second Optional Protocol to the International Covenant on Civil and Political Rights, aiming at the abolition of the death penalty.
      - Marta Santos Pais (Portugal): Former United Nations Assistant Secretary General and Special Representative of the Secretary General on Violence against Children, former UNICEF Director for Policy, Planning, and Evaluation and former UNICEF Director of the Innocenti Research Centre; International human rights lawyer; Head of the Portuguese Holocaust Remembrance Commission Never Forget.
      - Marzuki Darusman (Indonesia). Former Chair of the UN Independent Fact-Finding Mission on Myanmar; former UN Special Rapporteur on the situation of human rights in the Democratic People’s Republic of Korea; former Chair of the UN Secretary General’s Panel of Experts on Sri Lanka; former Attorney General of Indonesia.
      - Michèle Duvivier Pierre-Louis (Haiti). Steering Committee Member. Former Prime Minister of Haiti
      - Michelle Bachelet (Chile). Former President, Minister of Defense and Minister of Health of Chile, former United nations’ High Commissioner for Human Rights, first Director of the United Nations Entity for Gender Equality and the Empowerment of Women.
      - Radhika Coomaraswamy (Sri Lanka). Former UN Under-Secretary-General and Special Representative for Children and Armed Conflict (2006–2012); first UN Special Rapporteur on Violence Against Women (1994); co-founder of the International Centre for Ethnic Studies; prominent human rights advocate; appointed Commissioner of the International Commission against the Death Penalty (ICDP).
      - Sylvie Kayitesi (Rwanda). Former Deputy Chief Justice of Supreme Court of Rwanda; former Chairperson of the Working Group on Death Penalty and Extra-Judicial, Summary or Arbitrary killings in Africa (part-time); former Commissioner for the African Commission on Human and People’s Rights; former President of the National Human Rights Commission in Rwanda; former Minister of Public Service and Labour of Rwanda. Currently Director (legal) of the Economic Community of Central African States.
      - Tsakhiagiin Elbegdorj (Mongolia). Former President; former Prime Minister, Mongolia. Journalist.
    - Honorary Members:
      - Giuliano Amato (Italy). Former Judge of the Constitutional Court of Italy; former Prime Minister, former Deputy Prime Minister, former Minister (several Portfolios), former Senator, Italy; former Vice President of the Convention on the Future of Europe that drafted the European Constitution.
      - Jose Luis Rodriguez Zapatero (Spain). Former Prime Minister of Spain.
      - Louise Arbour (Canada). Former UN High Commissioner for Human Rights and Former Chief Prosecutor of the International Criminal Tribunals for the former Yugoslavia and Rwanda.
      - Marta Vilardell Coma (Malta). Former Ambassador at Large for Humanitarian and Social Issues and against the Death Penalty of Spain; former Ambassador of Spain to Malta.
      - Martin O'Malley (United States of America): Former Governor of Maryland, USA; former Mayor of Baltimore.
      - Mohammed Bedjaoui (Algeria). Former Foreign Minister of Algeria, Former Judge and President of the International Court of Justice.
    - Founding Members:
      - Asma Jilani Jahangir (1952 – 2018) (Pakistan). President of the Human Rights Commission of Pakistan and Former UN Special Rapporteur on extrajudicial, arbitrary and summary executions.
      - Bill Richardson (1947 – 2023) (United States of America): Former Governor of New Mexico, USA; former US Secretary of Energy; former US Ambassador to the United Nation
      - Federico Mayor Zaragoza (Founding President, 1934 – 2024) (Spain): Chairman of the Foundation for a Culture of Peace; former Director General, UNESCO; former Minister of Education and Science, Spain; former Member of European Parliament.
      - Robert Badinter (1928 – 2024) (France): Former President of the Court of Conciliation and Arbitration in the O.S.C.E.; former President of the Constitutional Council, former Senator, former Minister of Justice, France; former President of the Arbitration Commission of the Peace Conference on Yugoslavia.
      - Rodolfo Mattarollo (1939–2014) (Argentina). Former Consultant of the Secretariat of Human Rights of the Ministry of Justice of Argentina; former Sub-Secretary on Promotion and Protection of Human Rights of the Secretariat and head of the Cabinet of the Secretariat; former Coordinator of the Commission of UNASUR; former Head of the Human Rights Section of the UN Mission in Sierra Leona (UNAMSIL); former Deputy Executive Director and Head of Judicial Affairs and Institution Building of the International Civilian Mission of the OAS and UN in Haiti (MICIVIH).

== Secretariat ==
- Asunta Vivó Cavaller: Co-Executive Director
- Rajiv Narayan: Co-Executive Director

== Mandate and Objectives ==
The International Commission against the Death Penalty was established in 2010 with the fundamental mission to promote, complement, and support actions aimed at obtaining the universal abolition of the death penalty. The Commission's mandate is structured around three primary objectives and a series of strategic activities.

=== Core Objectives ===
Objective	Description
Promote Abolition	Advocating for the formal abolition of capital punishment in the legislation of countries that currently apply a de facto moratorium.
Universal Moratorium	Encouraging the establishment of a moratorium on executions in all regions of the world as a critical step toward total abolition.
Cessation of Executions	Soliciting the immediate stop of executions in cases where International Law restricts its application, particularly when it affects vulnerable groups (juvenile offenders, pregnant women, and persons with mental disabilities).

=== Strategic Activities ===
To achieve its mandate, the ICDP carries out several high-level activities:

- Diplomatic Intervention: Collaborating and intervening before high representatives of specific countries, as well as international and regional organizations.
- Public Advocacy: Making appeals and public statements on urgent matters relating to the death penalty.
- Mobilization: Participating in international conferences, seminars, and campaigns to mobilize public opinion and political will.
- Information Dissemination: Presenting research papers and reports at international forums to provide evidence-based analysis.
- Intellectual Works: Promoting artistic and intellectual works that support the abolitionist movement.

== International missions ==
ICDP undertakes missions to various countries to meet with government representatives and civil society actors to promote the abolition of the death penalty.

Year	Country / Region	Mission details and participants
2025	Morocco	Mission to the Kingdom of Morocco to engage in dialogue regarding the abolitionist process (November).
2025	South Korea	Mission to Seoul to consult with national and international stakeholders on the current status of capital punishment.
2025	Laos	Participation in the first-ever landmark seminar on the death penalty held in Vientiane (June).
2025	Japan	Delegation led by Commissioner Tsakhia Elbegdorj, former President of Mongolia (May).
2025	Council of Europe	Commissioner Marta Santos Pais participated in a thematic discussion at the Committee of Ministers in Strasbourg.
2025	United Nations	Commissioner Dannel Malloy represented ICDP at the UN Human Rights Council's high-level panel in Geneva.
2024	USA, South Korea, Italy	Conducted consecutive missions to Ohio (USA), Seoul, and Rome (November).
2024	Taiwan and Japan	Mission led by Commissioner Barbara Lochbihler and the ICDP Secretariat to Taipei and Tokyo (October).
2024	Switzerland	High-level delegation to Geneva led by President Navi Pillay and Vice President Ruth Dreifuss.
2024	Thailand	Follow-up mission to Bangkok to engage with government and judicial authorities (March).
2023	Zambia and Malawi	Joint dialogue initiative with the NGO Reprieve and the Zambian Ministry of Justice.
2023	Indonesia	Mission led by Commissioners Gloria Macapagal-Arroyo, Ruth Dreifuss, and Marzuki Darusman.
2023	Malaysia	Mission to congratulate the Malaysian Government on the abolition of the mandatory death penalty.
2022	Malawi	Mission to Lilongwe to support legislative progress towards abolition (October).
2022	USA	Meeting in Washington D.C. with ambassadors and senior diplomats, led by Ruth Dreifuss and Martin O'Malley.
2019	Qatar	Visit to Doha by Vice President Ibrahim Najjar and Commissioner Bill Richardson.
2019	Zambia	Mission headed by Commissioner Tsakhia Elbegdorj on the occasion of Human Rights Day.
2019	Cuba	Official visit to Havana by a delegation headed by President Navi Pillay (April).
2018	Vatican City	Private audience with His Holiness Pope Francis at the Vatican (December).
2017	South Korea	Mission led by President Navi Pillay and Judge Song Sang-Hyun to Seoul.
2017	Uganda	Commissioner Marc Bossuyt met with the Attorney General and visited Luzira Prison.
2017	USA	High-level mission to New York (UN) involving Pillay, Dreifuss, Duvivier, and Richardson.
2016	Guyana	Mission headed by Navi Pillay and UN Assistant Secretary-General Ivan Šimonović.
2016	Guatemala	Horacio Verbitsky represented ICDP at the "Forum against the Death Penalty" organized by the Congress of Guatemala.
2016	China	Commissioner Hanne Sophie Greve participated in a conference on criminal law reform in Beijing.
2014	Lebanon	Delegation led by Federico Mayor and Ibrahim Najjar met with the Prime Minister and parliamentarians.
2014	Suriname	Ruth Dreifuss and Greg Mulholland (UK MP) discussed abolition with the Surinamese government.
2013	Tajikistan	Commissioner Ruth Dreifuss met with President Emomali Rahmon to discuss abolitionist developments.
2013	Barbados, Trinidad and Tobago, Jamaica	Regional Caribbean mission in collaboration with the UK All Party Parliamentary Group.
2012	Japan	Visit to Tokyo to participate in a symposium on criminal justice organized by the Norwegian Embassy.
2011	Tajikistan	First official country mission by Ruth Dreifuss for the "Central Asia without Death Penalty" conference.

== Publications ==
The International Commission against the Death Penalty (ICDP) produces thematic reports and studies that serve as tools for advocacy and provide legal and political analysis for abolitionist movements worldwide.

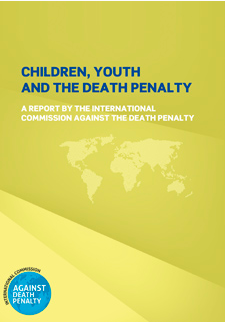
Children, Youth and the Death Penalty (2023)

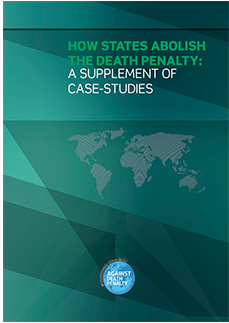
Supplement of Case-Studies (2020)

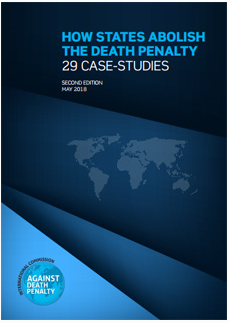
29 Case-Studies (2018)

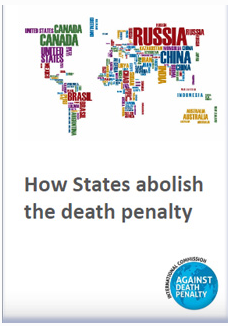
How States Abolish the Death Penalty (2013)

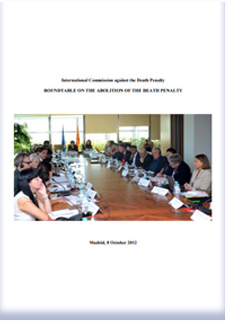
Roundtable on the Abolition (2012)

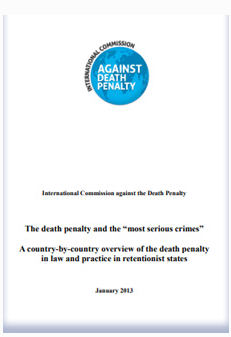
The Death Penalty and "Most Serious Crimes"

=== Thematic and Case Studies ===
- Children, Youth and the Death Penalty (2023): This report highlights how the death penalty affects children and youth, focusing on the protection of children's rights and the legal challenges of age-determination mechanisms.
- How States Abolish the Death Penalty series: A collection of studies that review the experiences of various nations as they moved towards abolition:
  - Supplement of Case-Studies (2020): Reviews the experiences of 21 states in their abolitionist process.
  - 29 Case-Studies (2018): Analyzes the transition in 26 countries and 3 U.S. states.
  - Initial Study (2013): Assesses lessons from 13 countries that successfully abolished capital punishment.
- The Death Penalty and the "Most Serious Crimes": A country-by-country overview of the death penalty in law and practice in retentionist states, specifically regarding the international legal threshold for executions.
- Report on Roundtable on the Abolition of the Death Penalty (2012): Outcomes of high-level meetings between governments, international organizations, NGOs, and academic experts.

These publications are often translated into multiple languages, including English, Spanish, French, Russian, Arabic, and Korean, to support global abolitionist efforts.

== Meetings and Governance ==
The ICDP holds at least two meetings per year to take decisions on future activities and coordinate international strategies. These meetings often bring together the Commissioners with representatives of the Support Group and other international stakeholders.

Most of the annual meetings take place in Spain, reinforcing the strong institutional ties between the Commission and its host country.

Year	Milestone / Location	Key Focus
2025	Madrid	XX Annual Meeting: Held in May 2025 to mark 15 years of institutional work.
2024	Madrid	Planning for missions to Ohio, South Korea, and Thailand.
2023	Geneva, Switzerland	Coordination with UN bodies and evaluation of missions to Malaysia and Indonesia.
2022	Hybrid (Madrid)	17th Meeting: Resumption of in-person diplomatic coordination.
2021	Virtual	Preparation for the 17th Meeting and General Assembly.
2020	Virtual	Adaptation of advocacy strategies during the COVID-19 pandemic.
2019	Madrid	Coordination for missions in Cuba and Sri Lanka.
2018	Madrid	13th Meeting: Review of the "How States Abolish" report series.
2017	Madrid	12th Meeting: Strategy for high-level interventions in retentionist states.
2016	Madrid	Review of missions to Belarus, China, and Guatemala.
2015	Madrid	10th Meeting of Commissioners: Appointment of Navi Pillay as Commissioner.
2014	Madrid	Preparation for major missions in Asia and the Caribbean.
2013	Madrid	Assessment of the first three years of global advocacy.
2012	Madrid	Focus on regional abolitionist processes and roundtable with NGOs.
2011	Geneva / Madrid	Coordination with UN agencies and first strategic roadmap.
2010	Madrid, Spain	Inaugural Meeting: Official establishment of the Commission on October 7.
