= List of official overseas trips made by Carl XVI Gustaf =

Since acceding to the throne of Sweden in 1973, Carl XVI Gustaf has made a number of state and official visits. He usually hosts one or two visiting heads of state each year.

== State visits abroad ==
Date	Country	Host
1970s
8–10 October 1974	Norway	King Olav V
19–21 December 1974	Finland	President Urho Kekkonen
10–12 April 1975	Denmark	Queen Margrethe II and Prince Henrik
10–12 June 1975	Iceland	President Kristján Eldjàrn
8–10 July 1975	United Kingdom	Queen Elizabeth II
2–30 April 1976	United States	President Gerald Ford
25–28 October 1976	Netherlands	Queen Juliana
15–18 March 1977	Belgium	King Baudouin I
7–15 June 1978	Soviet Union	Chairman Leonid Brezhnev
11–15 September 1978	Yugoslavia	President Josip Broz Tito
10–17 March 1979	West Germany	President Walter Scheel
6–9 November 1979	Austria	President Rudolf Kirchschläger
1980s
14–18 April 1980	Japan	Emperor Hirohito
16–19 June 1980	France	President Valéry Giscard d'Estaing
9–14 February 1981	Tanzania	President Julius Nyerere
20–24 February 1981	Saudi Arabia	King Khalid
14–23 September 1981	China	Government of China
17–23 January 1982	Mexico	President José López Portillo
26 March–6 April 1982	Australia	Governor-General Sir Zelman Cowen
22–25 March 1983	Spain	King Juan Carlos I
22–25 August 1983	Finland	President Mauno Koivisto
21–23 September 1983	Luxembourg	Grand Duke Jean I
2–7 April 1984	Brazil	President João Figueiredo
29 September–5 October 1986	Portugal	President Mário Soares
1–6 November 1986	Egypt	President Hosni Mubarak
23–26 June 1987	Iceland	President Vigdís Finnbogadóttir
14–19 March 1988	Canada	Governor General Jeanne Sauvé
13–16 February 1989	New Zealand	Governor-General Sir Paul Reeves
18–21 September 1989	Jordan	King Hussein I
1990s
8–10 April 1991	Italy	President Francesco Cossiga
2–4 May 1991	Vatican City	Pope John Paul II
27–30 May 1991	Hungary	President Árpád Göncz
7–9 April 1992	Ireland	President Mary Robinson
22–24 April 1992	Estonia	President Lennart Meri
9–11 September 1992	Latvia	President Anatolijs Gorbunovs
15–16 October 1992	Lithuania	President Vytautas Landsbergis
27–29 April 1993	Germany	President Richard von Weizsäcker
7–9 June 1993	Norway	King Harald V and Queen Sonja
22–24 September 1993	Poland	President Lech Wałęsa
11–16 October 1993	India	President Shankar Dayal Sharma and Mrs. Vimala Sharma
16–18 May 1995	Czech Republic	President Václav Havel
12–15 March 1996	Malaysia	Yang di-Pertuan Agong Tuanku Jaafar
28–30 August 1996	Finland	President Martti Ahtisaari
2–5 December 1996	Chile	President Eduardo Frei Ruiz-Tagle
18–20 February 1997	South Africa	President Nelson Mandela
3–6 November 1998	Mozambique	President Joaquim Chissano
26–19 April 1999	Greece	President Konstantinos Stephanopoulos
2000s
9–11 November 2000	Bulgaria	President Petar Stoyanov
8–11 May 2001	Belgium	King Albert II
8–11 November 2001	Russia	President Vladimir Putin
3–5 April 2002	Slovakia	President Rudolf Schuster
5–7 November 2002	Mexico	President Vicente Fox
25 February–1 March 2003	Thailand	King Bhumibol Adulyadej
8–10 April 2003	Romania	President Ion Iliescu
26–28 August 2003	Finland	President Tarja Halonen
2–6 February 2004	Vietnam	President Trần Đức Lương
7–9 February 2004	Brunei	Sultan Hassanal Bolkiah
15–17 June 2004	Slovenia	President Janez Drnovšek
7–9 September 2004	Iceland	President Ólafur Ragnar Grímsson
7–12 November 2005	Australia	Governor-General Michael Jeffery
30 May–1 June 2006	Turkey	President Ahmet Necdet Sezer
17–22 July 2006	China	President Hu Jintao
24–27 October 2006	Canada	Governor General Michaëlle Jean
26–31 March 2007	Japan	Emperor Akihito
9–11 May 2007	Denmark	Queen Margrethe II and Prince Henrik
20–22 November 2007	Austria	President Heinz Fischer
5–7 May 2008	Portugal	President Cavaco Silva
30 September–3 October 2008	Ukraine	President Viktor Yushchenko
24–27 March 2009	Italy	President Giorgio Napolitano
21–23 April 2009	Netherlands	Queen Beatrix
2010s
23–26 March 2010	Brazil	President Lula da Silva
22–25 March 2011	Botswana	President Ian Khama
4–6 May 2011	Poland	President Bronisław Komorowski
30 May–1 June 2012	South Korea	President Lee Myung-bak
16–18 April 2013	Croatia	President Ivo Josipović
25–26 March 2014	Latvia	President Andris Bērziņš
2–4 December 2014	France	President François Hollande
3–5 March 2015	Finland	President Sauli Niinistö
7–9 October 2015	Lithuania	President Dalia Grybauskaitė
8–10 June 2016	Bhutan	King Jigme Khesar Namgyel Wangchuck and Queen Jetsun Pema
5–8 October 2016	Germany	President Joachim Gauck and Mrs. Daniela Schadt
3–6 April 2017	Brazil	President Michel Temer and Mrs. Marcela Temer
22–24 May 2017	Indonesia	President Joko Widodo and Mrs. Iriana Joko Widodo
22–24 May 2019	Ireland	President Michael D Higgins and Mrs. Sabina Higgins
14–15 June 2019	South Korea	President Moon Jae-in
2–6 December 2019	India	President Ram Nath Kovind and Mrs. Savita Kovind
2020s
17-17 November 2022	Jordan	King Abdullah II and Queen Rania
2–4 May 2023	Estonia	President Alar Karis and Mrs. Sirje Karis
5 May 2023	United Kingdom	King Charles III
12–14 March 2024	Mexico	President Andrés Manuel López Obrador and Mrs. Beatriz Gutiérrez Müller
19-21 November 2024	Singapore	President Tharman Shanmugaratnam
22 May 2025	Latvia	President Edgars Rinkēvičs
2 June 2025	Finland	President Alexander Stubb, first lady Suzanne Innes-Stubb and Former Prime Minister of Sweden Carl Bildt
1 October 2025	Belgium	NATO Secretary General Mark Rutte
18 November 2025	Canada	Prime Minister Mark Carney
10–12 March 2026	Poland	President Karol Nawrocki
17 April 2026	Ukraine	President Volodymyr Zelenskyy
18 May 2026	Lithuania	President Gitanas Nausėda

== Number of State Visits by country ==
Countries	State Visits	Notes
Finland	6	1974, 1983, 1996, 2003, 2015, 2025
Poland	3	1993, 2011, 2026
Belgium	3	1977, 2001, 2025
Canada	3	1988, 2006, 2025
Iceland	3	1975, 1987, 2004
Mexico	3	1982, 2002, 2024
Brazil	3	1984, 2010, 2017
Germany	3 (Note: One was made to West Germany before the unification of Germany.)	1979, 1993, 2016
Norway	2	1974, 1993
Denmark	2	1975, 2007
Estonia	2	1992, 2023
Latvia	2	1992, 2025
Lithuania	2	1992, 2026
Ukraine	2	2008, 2026
United Kingdom	2	1975, 2023
Netherlands	2	1976, 2009
Austria	2	1979, 2007
Japan	2	1980, 2007
France	2	1980, 2014
China	2	1981, 2006
Australia	2	1982, 2005
Portugal	2	1986, 2008
Jordan	2	1989, 2022
South Korea	2	2012, 2019
United States	1	1976
Soviet Union	1	1978
Yugoslavia	1	1978
Tanzania	1	1981
Saudi Arabia	1	1981
Spain	1	1983
Luxembourg	1	1983
Holy See	1	1991
Hungary	1	1991
Czech Republic	1	1995
Malaysia	1	1996
Chile	1	1996
South Africa	1	1997
Mozambique	1	1998
Greece	1	1999
Bulgaria	1	2000
Slovakia	1	2002
Thailand	1	2003
Romania	1	2003
Vietnam	1	2004
Brunei	1	2004
Slovenia	1	2004
Turkey	1	2006
Botswana	1	2011
Croatia	1	2013
Bhutan	1	2016
Indonesia	1	2017
Singapore	1	2024
Egypt	1	1986

== See also ==
- List of state visits received by Carl XVI Gustaf
