= Walther Sommerlath =

German businessman; father of Queen Silvia of Sweden (1901–1990)

- Born: Carl August Walther Sommerlath; 22 January 1901; Heidelberg, German Empire
- Died: 21 October 1990 (aged 89); Heidelberg, Germany
- Spouse: Alice Soares de Toledo (m. 1925)
- Children: Ralf Sommerlath; Walther Ludwig Sommerlath; Hans Jörg Sommerlath; Silvia, Queen of Sweden

Carl August Walther Sommerlath (22 January 1901 – 21 October 1990) was a German businessman and the father of Queen Silvia of Sweden.

After World War II, Sommerlath served as president of a Brazilian subsidiary of the Swedish steel-parts manufacturer Uddeholm Tooling.

== Early life ==
Sommerlath was born and raised in Heidelberg, Grand Duchy of Baden in the German Empire (Baden-Württemberg, Germany). His parents were Louis Carl Moritz Sommerlath (1860–1930), who was born in Chicago, in the United States, and Erna Sophie Christine Waldau (1864–1944). In the mid-1920s, Walther Sommerlath moved to São Paulo, Brazil, where he worked for the steel company Açus Roechling Boulerus do Brasil, a subsidiary in the German steel group Röchling.

== Marriage ==
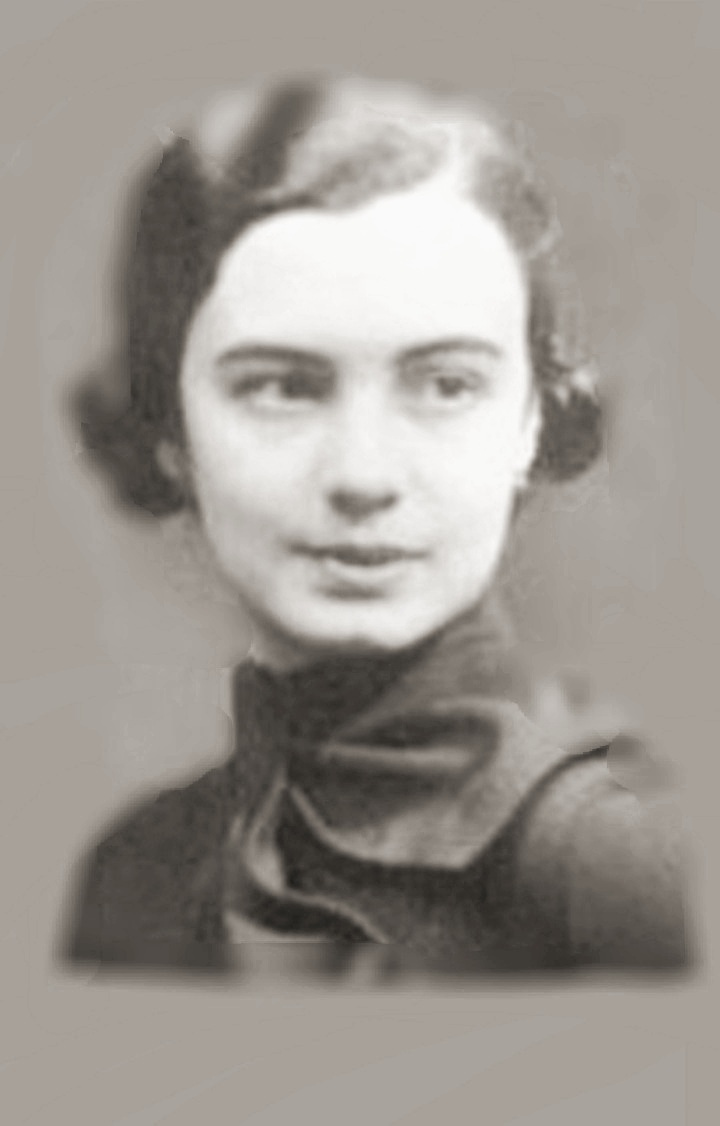
Alice Soares de Toledo

Sommerlath became involved with a Brazilian woman, Alice Soares de Toledo (1906–1997). She was the daughter of Arthur Floriano de Toledo and his wife Elisa de Novaes Soares. On 10 December 1925, in Santa Cecília, São Paulo, the couple married, eventually having four children:

- Ralf Sommerlath (born 26 November 1929)
- Walther Ludwig Sommerlath (1934–2020)
- Hans Jörg Sommerlath (1941–2006)
- Silvia Renate Sommerlath (born 23 December 1943), married in 1976 to King Carl XVI Gustaf of Sweden

== Life in Germany ==
In 1938, Walther Sommerlath left Brazil and returned to Heidelberg. In 1939, he moved to the German capital Berlin. Between 1939 and 1943, Sommerlath ran a company in Berlin that the Nazis had seized from its Jewish owners. This company manufactured arms used in World War II. In 1943, Sommerlath's plant was destroyed by Allied bombs. Later that year, the Sommerlath family returned to Heidelberg.

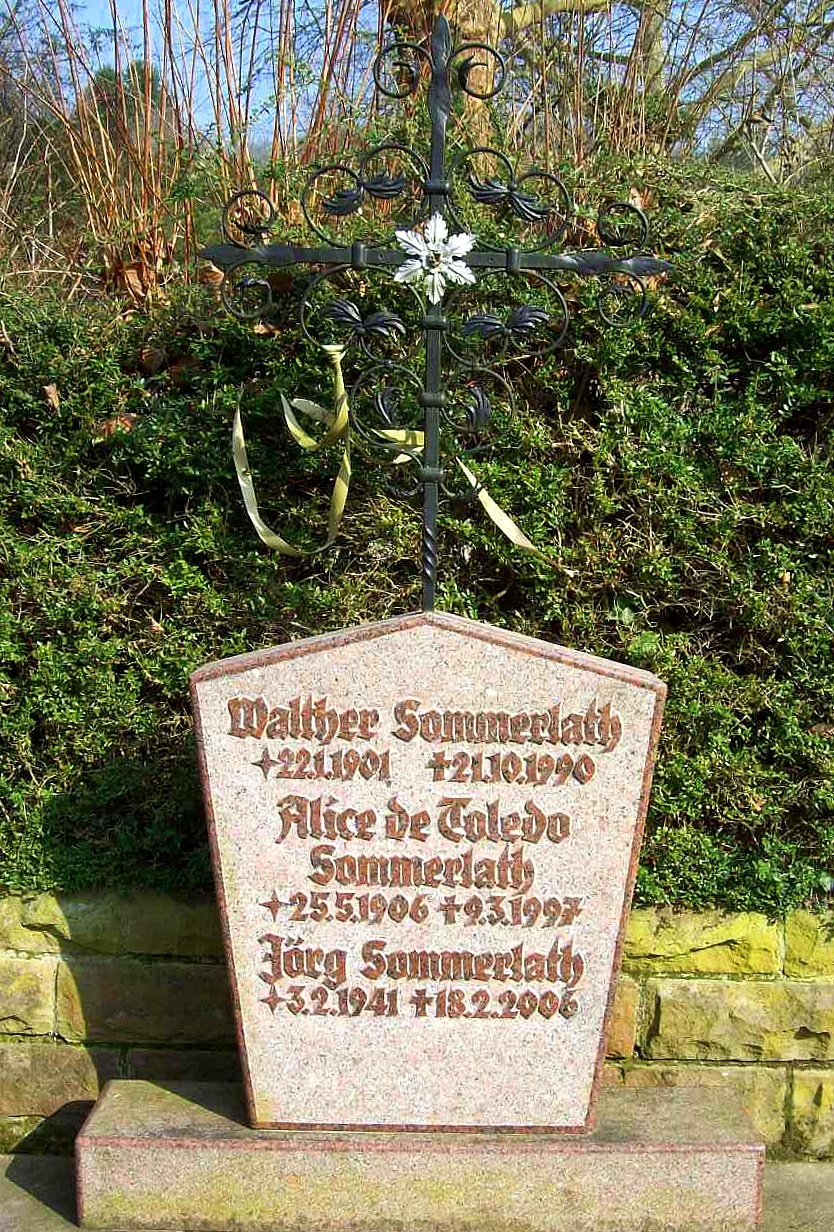
Grave of Walther, Alice and Jörg Sommerlath

After the war, in 1947 the Sommerlath family returned to Brazil, where Walther Sommerlath worked as the president of the Brazilian subsidiary of the Swedish steel-parts manufacturer Uddeholm. The family finally moved back to Heidelberg in 1957, and Sommerlath died in Heidelberg in October 1990.

=== Membership in the Nazi Party ===
Not much is publicly known about Sommerlath's Nazi affiliations. Living as a German citizen in São Paulo, Brazil, Sommerlath joined the German National Socialist Worker's Party (NSDAP/AO) as an expatriate member on 1 December 1934. His member number was 3592030. His brother Paul Sommerlath had joined the Party in 1933. Most Germans in Brazil chose not to be members in the party. Thus, Brazil's president, Getúlio Vargas, found no real opposition when he decided to outlaw the party in 1938. The Sommerlath brothers remained members of the Nazi party until the party was banned and dissolved by the Allies in 1945.

In 1976, when Silvia was about to marry King Carl XVI Gustaf of Sweden, the Swedish daily Expressen interviewed Sommerlath about his Nazi background. In the interview, Sommerlath denied that he had any connections with the Nazi Party, saying that his only participation in the war was his work at the arms factory in Berlin.

The Swedish royal family has declined to comment on the Queen's father's role in the war or reveal other facts about his company. But on 16 May 2011, in reaction to a Swedish TV news magazine, Queen Silvia announced that she would probe her father's alleged Nazi ties.

In 2020, a group of researchers announced newly discovered diaries and notes that indicate Walther Sommerlath participated in organizing the rescue of German, anti-Hitler resistance members and Jewish people during the war. After Claus von Stauffenberg had failed in his attempt to assassinate Hitler on 20 July 1944, fifteen resistance members, along with a number of Jewish people, were smuggled to Sweden by train. Walther Sommerlath's name appears in documents originally held by German resistance member Otto Wegner. The train left some hundred kilometers southeast from Berlin containing furniture. When it arrived in Berlin, the furniture was removed, and the people loaded in, along with some concrete pillars to make up for the weight difference. The train arrived in Trelleborg in southern Sweden safely. Swedish diplomats, members of the Swedish church in Berlin and a few Germans are said to have been involved in the planning.
