= List of state visits received by Carl XVI Gustaf =

Since acceding to the throne of Sweden in 1973, Carl XVI Gustaf has received a number of state and official visits. He usually hosts one or two visiting heads of state each year.

== List of visits ==
| No. | Date | Country | Regime | Guests |
1970s
| 1 | 21–24 October 1975 | Finland | Republic | President Urho Kekkonen |
| 2 | 25–28 November 1975 | Norway | Monarchy | King Olav V |
| 3 | 29–30 March 1976 | Yugoslavia | Republic | President Tito |
| 4 | 18–19 May 1976 | Austria | Republic | President Rudolf Kirchschläger |
| 5 | 16–19 October 1979 | Spain | Monarchy | King Juan Carlos I and Queen Sofia |
1980s
| 6 | 22–25 May 1980 | Mexico | Republic | President José López Portillo |
| 7 | 6–9 November 1980 | Romania | Republic | President Nicolae Ceausescu |
| 8 | 18–20 May 1981 | Canada | Monarchy | Governor General Edward Schreyer |
| 9 | 26–29 October 1981 | Iceland | Republic | President Vigdís Finnbogadóttir |
| 10 | 27–29 April 1982 | Finland | Republic | President Mauno Koivisto |
| 11 | 25–28 May 1983 | United Kingdom | Monarchy | Queen Elizabeth II and Prince Philip, Duke of Edinburgh |
| 12 | 16–18 May 1984 | France | Republic | President François Mitterrand |
| 13 | 12–14 February 1985 | Zambia | Republic | President Kenneth Kaunda |
| 14 | 22–24 April 1985 | Switzerland | Republic | Swiss Federal Council |
| 15 | 4–6 June 1985 | Japan | Monarchy | Crown Prince Akihito and Crown Princess Michiko (representing Emperor Hirohito) |
| 16 | 3–6 September 1985 | Denmark | Monarchy | Queen Margrethe II and Prince Henrik |
| 17 | 22–24 April 1986 | Algeria | Republic | President Chadli Bendjedid |
| 18 | 29 September–5 October 1986 | Portugal | Republic | President Mário Soares and Mrs. Maria Barroso |
| 19 | 1–6 November 1986 | Egypt | Republic | President Hosni Mubarak and Mrs. Suzanne Mubarak |
| 20 | 21–23 May 1987 | Netherlands | Monarchy | Queen Beatrix and Prince Claus |
| 21 | 31 May–3 June 1988 | West Germany | Republic | President Richard von Weizsäcker and Mrs. Marianne von Weizsäcker |
1990s
| 22 | 21–23 May 1990 | Israel | Republic | President Chaim Herzog and Mrs. Aura Herzog |
| 23 | 9–12 October 1990 | Portugal | Republic | President Mário Soares and Mrs. Maria Barroso |
| 24 | 22–24 May 1991 | Czechoslovakia | Republic | President Václav Havel and Mrs. Olga Havlová |
| 25 | 17–19 October 1991 | Luxembourg | Monarchy | Grand Duke Jean and Grand Duchess Joséphine-Charlotte |
| 26 | 12–14 May 1992 | Norway | Monarchy | King Harald V and Queen Sonja |
| 27 | 13–15 April 1994 | Finland | Republic | President Martti Ahtisaari and Mrs. Eeva Ahtisaari |
| 28 | 3–5 May 1994 | Belgium | Monarchy | King Albert II and Queen Paola |
| 29 | 29–31 March 1995 | Poland | Republic | President Lech Wałęsa and Mrs. Danuta Wałęsa |
| 30 | 11–13 September 1995 | Estonia | Republic | President Lennart Meri and Mrs. Helle Meri |
| 31 | 16–18 October 1995 | Latvia | Republic | President Guntis Ulmanis and Mrs. Aina Ulmane |
| 32 | 21–23 November 1995 | Lithuania | Republic | President Algirdas Brazauskas |
| 33 | 15–17 April 1997 | Ireland | Republic | President Mary Robinson and Mr. Nicholas Robinson |
| 34 | 23–25 September 1997 | Austria | Republic | President Thomas Klestil and Mrs. Edith Klestil |
| 35 | 2–4 December 1997 | Russia | Republic | President Boris Yeltsin and Mrs. Naina Yeltsina |
| 36 | 5–7 May 1998 | Italy | Republic | President Oscar Luigi Scalfaro and Ms. Marianna Scalfaro |
| 37 | 26–28 May 1998 | Argentina | Republic | President Carlos Menem and Ms. Zulema María Eva Menem |
| 38 | 24–26 November 1998 | Iceland | Republic | President Ólafur Ragnar Grimsson |
| 39 | 17–18 March 1999 | South Africa | Republic | President Nelson Mandela and Mrs. Graça Machel |
| 40 | 23–25 March 1999 | Ukraine | Republic | President Leonid Kuchma and Mrs. Liudmyla Kuchma |
| 41 | 5–7 October 1999 | Slovenia | Republic | President Milan Kučan and Mrs. Štefka Kučan |
2000s
| 42 | 10–11 April 2000 | France | Republic | President Jacques Chirac and Mrs. Bernadette Chirac |
| 43 | 2–3 May 2000 | Finland | Republic | President Tarja Halonen and Mr. Pentti Arajärvi |
| 44 | 29–31 May 2000 | Japan | Monarchy | Emperor Akihito and Empress Michiko |
| 45 | 9–11 November 2000 | Bulgaria | Republic | President Petar Stoyanov and Mrs. Antonina Stoyanova |
| 46 | 20–22 May 2003 | Germany | Republic | President Johannes Rau and Mrs. Christina Rau |
| 47 | 7–9 October 2003 | Jordan | Monarchy | King Abdullah II and Queen Rania |
| 48 | 31 March–1 April 2005 | Latvia | Republic | President Vaira Vike-Freiberga and Mr. Imants Freibergs |
| 49 | 14–15 September 2005 | Malaysia | Monarchy | Yang Di-Pertuan Agong (King) Tuanku Syed Sirajuddin and Raja Permaisuri Agong (Queen) Tuanku Fauziah |
| 50 | 21–23 March 2006 | Botswana | Republic | President Festus Mogae and Mrs. Barbara Mogae |
| 51 | 8–10 June 2007 | China | Republic | President Hu Jintao and Mrs. Liu Yongqing |
| 52 | 11–12 September 2007 | Brazil | Republic | President Luiz Inácio Lula da Silva and Mrs. Marisa Letícia Lula da Silva |
| 53 | 9–11 October 2007 | Bulgaria | Republic | President Georgi Parvanov and Mrs. Zorka Parvanova |
| 54 | 11 March 2008 | Romania | Republic | President Traian Băsescu and Mrs. Maria Băsescu |
| 55 | 15–16 April 2008 | Luxembourg | Monarchy | Grand Duke Henri and Grand Duchess Maria-Teresa |
| 56 | 20–22 May 2008 | Greece | Republic | President Karolos Papoulias |
2010s
| 57 | 18–20 January 2011 | Estonia | Republic | President Toomas Hendrik Ilves and Mrs. Evelin Ilves |
| 58 | 17–18 April 2012 | Finland | Republic | President Sauli Niinistö and Mrs. Jenni Haukio |
| 59 | 11–13 March 2013 | Turkey | Republic | President Abdullah Gül and Mrs. Hayrünnisa Gül |
| 60 | 1–3 October 2013 | Portugal | Republic | President Aníbal Cavaco Silva and Mrs. Maria Cavaco Silva |
| 61 | 31 May–2 June 2015 | India | Republic | President Pranab Mukherjee |
| 62 | 4–6 November 2015 | Tunisia | Republic | President Beji Caid Essebsi and Mrs. Chadlia Farhat Essebsi |
| 63 | 10–12 May 2016 | Chile | Republic | President Michelle Bachelet |
| 64 | 20–23 February 2017 | Canada | Monarchy | Governor General David Johnston and Mrs. Sharon Johnston |
| 65 | 17–19 January 2018 | Iceland | Republic | President Guðni Th. Jóhannesson and Mrs. Eliza Reid |
| 66 | 13–15 November 2018 | Italy | Republic | President Sergio Mattarella and Ms. Laura Mattarella |
| 67 | 14–15 June 2019 | South Korea | Republic | President Moon Jae-in and Mrs. Kim Jung-sook |
2020s
| 68 | 7–9 September 2021 | Germany | Republic | President Frank-Walter Steinmeier and Mrs. Elke Büdenbender |
| 69 | 24–25 November 2021 | Spain | Monarchy | King Felipe VI and Queen Letizia |
| 70 | 17–18 May 2022 | Finland | Republic | President Sauli Niinistö and Mrs. Jenni Haukio |
| 71 | 11–13 October 2022 | Netherlands | Monarchy | King Willem-Alexander and Queen Máxima |
| 72 | 30–31 January 2024 | France | Republic | President Emmanuel Macron and Mrs. Brigitte Macron |
| 73 | 23–24 April 2024 | Finland | Republic | President Alexander Stubb and Mrs. Suzanne Innes-Stubb |
| 74 | 6–8 May 2024 | Denmark | Monarchy | King Frederik X and Queen Mary |

== See also ==
- List of official overseas trips made by Carl XVI Gustaf
