= Lise Kingo =

Danish businesswoman

Executive Director of the United Nations Global Compact
- Incumbent
- Assumed office 25 June 2015
- Appointed by: Ban Ki-moon
- Preceded by: Georg Kell

Personal details
- Born: 3 August 1961 (age 64) Vojens, Denmark

Lise Kingo (born 3 August 1961) is a Danish businesswoman who currently serves as Independent Board Director on Fortune 500 companies Danone, and Sanofi as well as Allianz Trade in Belgium.

Kingo also serves on the Corporate Governance Council of INSEAD.

She was previously CEO & Executive Director of the United Nations Global Compact, succeeding Georg Kell.

Before her appointment to the position by United Nations Secretary-General Ban Ki-moon on 25 June 2015, she was the Executive Vice President, Chief of Staff, and member of executive management at Novo Nordisk, a prominent multinational pharmaceutical company headquartered in her native country of Denmark. Her tenure in business has been consistently marked by a dedication to social responsibility and sustainability while still achieving business goals and driving growth.

== Education ==
Kingo holds a Master's of Science in Responsibility and Business Practice from the University of Bath, along with a certificate in Corporate Governance from INSEAD. In addition, she also holds Bachelors of Arts in Religions and Ancient Greek Culture from the University of Aarhus, Denmark and a Bachelor of Commerce in Marketing Economics from the Copenhagen Business School.

== Novo Nordisk ==
Kingo came onto Novo Nordisk in 1988 as Director of Environmental Affairs. She served as Director from 1988 until 1999 when she was promoted to and Senior Vice President of Stakeholder Relations from 1999 to 2002. Thereafter, she became Chief of Staff, Executive Vice-President, and a member of the Executive Management team until 2014. During her time at Novo Nordisk, Kingo handled "human resources, quality/business assurance, corporate communications, and ... corporate stakeholder engagement" for the pharmaceutical firm widely known for its place in providing diabetes medicines in the European market. She was applauded for her work in improving business profitability and their sustainability standings maintained by the Dow Jones index throughout her time with the company. She also was an integral part of Novo's annual diabetes barometer index, which started in 2007. She is known for her execution of the "Triple Bottom Line" approach wherein economic, social, and environmental concerns (also known as "People, Planet, Profit") are concurrently addressed. Additionally, she published scholarly articles on the relationship between international development, health and disease, and the private sector.

== The UN Global Compact ==
Lise Kingo was appointed to the position of Executive Director on 25 June 2015. During her time as executive director, Kingo has set out several priorities to help facilitate the achievement of the organization's overarching goals and placing a priority on the synergy between the goals of the United Nations Sustainable Development Goals (SDGs). In a November 2015 interview, Kingo remarked "We think the goals should be seen as a source of inspiration and a platform for new growth" indicating a desire for collaboration between the private sector, international organizations, and civil society as a whole. Kingo has made a series of executive updates on the Global Compact's work, focusing on a range of topics such as the historic climate agreement from Paris at COP 21, the official adoption of the Sustainable Development Goals (SDGs), and Sustainability in Davos. Kingo has also been noted as an integral part of a new wave of appointments of high-ranking female United Nations officials, indicating a shift in the demographics of who had traditionally held those positions in the past.

== Other activities ==
- Board Leadership Society of Denmark, Member of the Board (since 2021)
- Boards Impact Forum, Nordic Chapter of the World Economic Forum, Member of the Board (since 2021)

== Recognition ==
- 2020 - Thomson Reuters Responsible Business Honoree Award
- 2018 – Copenhagen Business School 2018 Honorary Alumni Award
- 2002 - Edinburgh Medal
- 1998 - Tomorrow Magazine’s Environmental Leadership Award

== See also ==
- Sanda Ojiambo
