= Sommerlad =

Sommerlad is a surname. Notable people with the surname include:

- Bernhard Sommerlad (1905–1979), German journalist, Verlagsbuchhändler und Schriftsteller
- Ernst Sommerlad (1895–1977), German architect
- Fritz Sommerlad (1866–1918), German philosopher (Wikisource: Fritz Sommerlad)
- Ralf Sommerlad (1952–2015), German biologist, author und nature photographer
- Theo Sommerlad (1869–1940), German historian
- Ernest Sommerlad (1886–1952), Australian politician, father of Lloyd
- Lloyd Sommerlad (1919–2014), Australian politician, son of Ernest

== See also ==
- Sommerlath
- Somerled (mid-12th-century), Norse-Gaelic lord who created the Kingdom of Argyll and the Isles
