= Carl XVI Gustaf =

King of Sweden since 1973

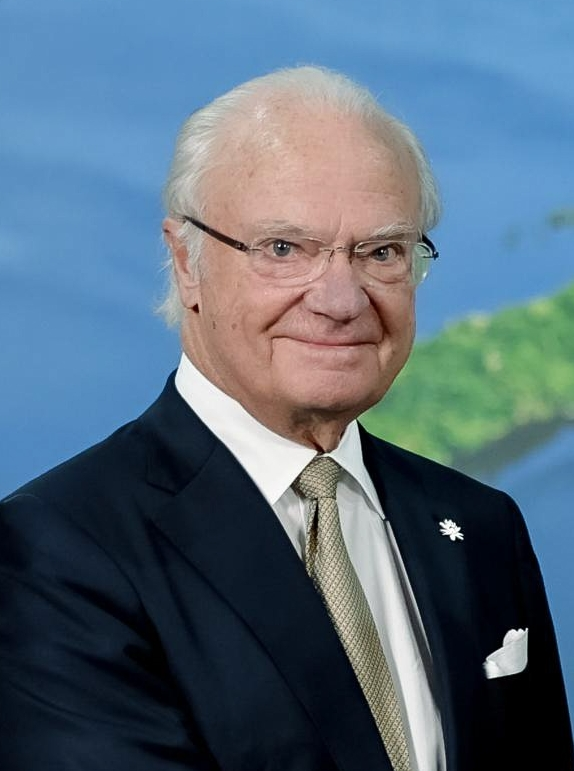
- Carl Gustaf in 2025

King of Sweden
- Reign: 15 September 1973 – present
- Enthronement: 19 September 1973
- Predecessor: Gustaf VI Adolf
- Heir apparent: Victoria
- Born: 30 April 1946 (age 80); Haga Palace, Solna, Sweden
- Spouse: Silvia Sommerlath (m. 1976)
- Issue: Crown Princess Victoria; Prince Carl Philip; Princess Madeleine
Names
- Carl Gustaf Folke Hubertus
- House: Bernadotte
- Father: Prince Gustaf Adolf, Duke of Västerbotten
- Mother: Princess Sibylla of Saxe-Coburg and Gotha
- Education: Uppsala University; Stockholm University

Carl XVI Gustaf (Carl Gustaf Folke Hubertus; born 30 April 1946) is King of Sweden, reigning since 15 September 1973. He is the longest-reigning monarch in Swedish history and the second longest-serving current head of state.

Carl Gustaf was born during the reign of his paternal great-grandfather, King Gustaf V, as the youngest child and only son of Prince Gustaf Adolf, Duke of Västerbotten, and Princess Sibylla of Saxe-Coburg and Gotha. His father died in an airplane crash in Denmark in January 1947, when Carl Gustaf was nine months old. Carl Gustaf became crown prince and heir apparent to the Swedish throne at the age of four when his grandfather Gustaf VI Adolf acceded to the throne in 1950.

Carl Gustaf acceded to the throne upon his grandfather's death on 15 September 1973. Shortly after he became king, the new 1974 Instrument of Government took effect, formally stripping the monarchy of its remaining executive powers. As a result, Carl Gustaf no longer performs many of the duties normally accorded to a head of state in parliamentary regimes, such as the formal appointment of the prime minister, signing legislation into law, and being commander-in-chief of the nation's military. The new instrument explicitly limited the king to ceremonial and representative functions, while he retained the right to be regularly informed of affairs of state. As head of the House of Bernadotte, Carl Gustaf has also made decisions concerning the titles and positions of its members.

In June 1976, Carl Gustaf married Silvia Sommerlath. They have three children: Victoria, Carl Philip, and Madeleine. The king's heir apparent, after passage on 1 January 1980 of a new law establishing absolute primogeniture, is his eldest child, Crown Princess Victoria. Victoria's younger brother, Carl Philip, was briefly the heir apparent from his birth in May 1979 until the application of said law.

== Early life ==
Carl Gustaf was born on 30 April 1946 at 10:20 at Haga Palace in Solna, Stockholm County. He was the youngest of five children and the only son of Prince Gustaf Adolf, Duke of Västerbotten and Princess Sibylla of Saxe-Coburg and Gotha. He was christened at the Royal Chapel on 7 June 1946 by the Archbishop of Uppsala, Erling Eidem.

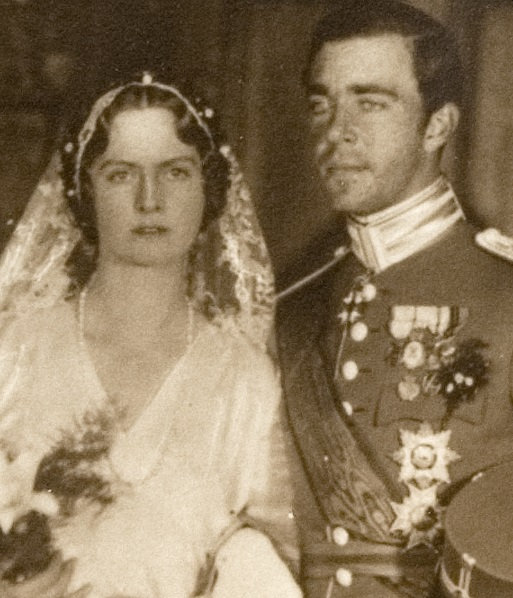
Carl Gustaf's parents, Prince Gustaf Adolf and Princess Sibylla

During the ceremony, he was baptised in Charles XI's baptismal font. His godparents included the Crown Prince and Crown Princess of Denmark, his paternal uncle and aunt; the Crown Prince of Norway, Princess Juliana of the Netherlands; the King of Sweden, his paternal great-grandfather; the Hereditary Prince of Saxe-Coburg and Gotha, his maternal uncle; the Crown Prince and Crown Princess of Sweden, his paternal grandfather and step-grandmother; and Count Folke and Countess Maria Bernadotte of Wisborg.

Carl Gustaf was also given the title of Duke of Jämtland. His father was killed in an airplane crash on 26 January 1947 at Copenhagen Airport. His father's death left the nine-month-old prince second in line to the throne, behind his grandfather, then Crown Prince Gustaf Adolf. When his paternal great-grandfather, Gustaf V, died in 1950, the four-year-old prince became heir apparent of Sweden.

Carl Gustaf was seven years old before he was told about his father's death. He spoke about growing up without knowing his father in a speech in 2005.

== Youth and education ==
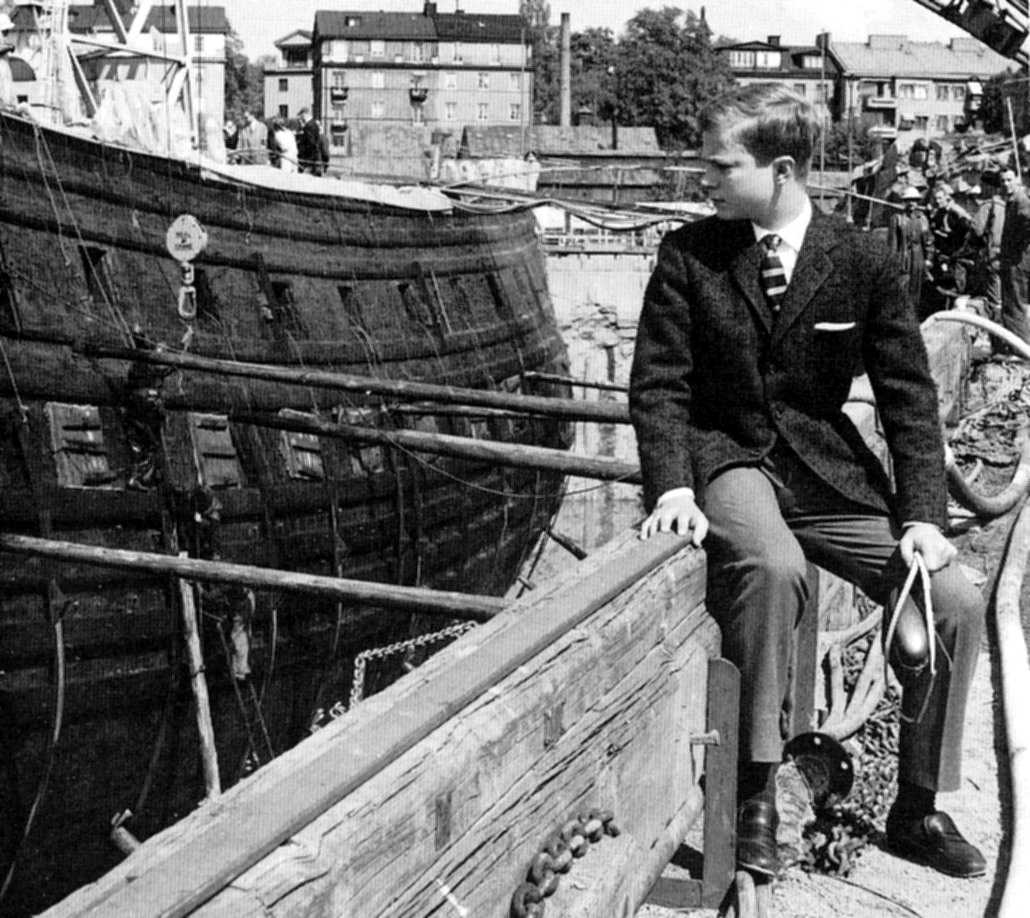
The 15-year-old Crown Prince of Sweden looks at the recently recovered 17th-century warship Vasa in 1961.

Carl Gustaf received his earliest education privately at the Royal Palace. He was then sent to Broms school, and then on to Sigtuna boarding school. After graduating from high school in 1966, Carl Gustaf completed two-and-a-half years of education in the Swedish Army, the Royal Swedish Navy, and the Swedish Air Force. During the winter of 1966–67, he took part in a round-the-world voyage with the mine-laying vessel Älvsnabben. Carl Gustaf received his commission as an officer in all three services in 1968, eventually rising to the rank of captain (in the army and air force) and lieutenant (in the navy), before his accession to the throne. He also completed his academic studies in history, sociology, political science, tax law, and economics at Uppsala University and later economics at Stockholm University.

To prepare for his role as head of state, Carl Gustaf followed a broad programme of studies on the court system, social organisations and institutions, trade unions, and employers' associations. In addition, he closely studied the affairs of the Riksdag, Government, and Ministry for Foreign Affairs. He also spent time at the Swedish mission to the United Nations and the Swedish International Development Cooperation Agency (SIDA), worked at a bank and the Swedish embassy in London, and at the Swedish Chamber of Commerce and at the Alfa Laval Company factory in France. In 1970, he represented King Gustaf VI Adolf at the head of the Swedish delegation to the World Exposition in Osaka, Japan. Since his youth, Carl Gustaf has been a strong supporter of the Scout Movement in Sweden.

Carl Gustaf has dyslexia, as do his daughter Crown Princess Victoria and his son Prince Carl Philip. He holds honorary doctoral degrees from the Swedish University of Agricultural Sciences, KTH Royal Institute of Technology, the Stockholm School of Economics and Åbo Akademi University in Finland.

== Reign ==
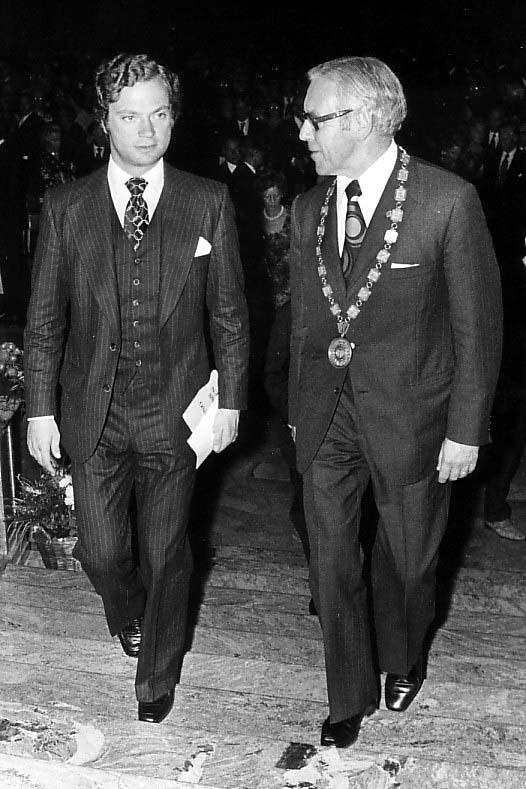
Carl Gustaf and MP Stig Stefanson at Stockholm City Hall in 1975

Carl Gustaf ascended the throne upon the death of his grandfather, Gustaf VI Adolf, on 15 September 1973. Four days later, he took the required regal assurance (Swedish: Konungaförsäkran) during an extraordinary meeting of the cabinet. He then appeared before members of parliament, the diplomatic corps and court in the Hall of State, where he was enthroned on the Silver Throne and gave a speech. Both the cabinet meeting and ceremony at the Hall were broadcast live on television. Following the ceremonies, he appeared on the balcony to acknowledge gathered crowds.

Carl Gustaf undertook his first state visit as king on 6 October 1974, meeting with his godfather King Olav V in Norway.

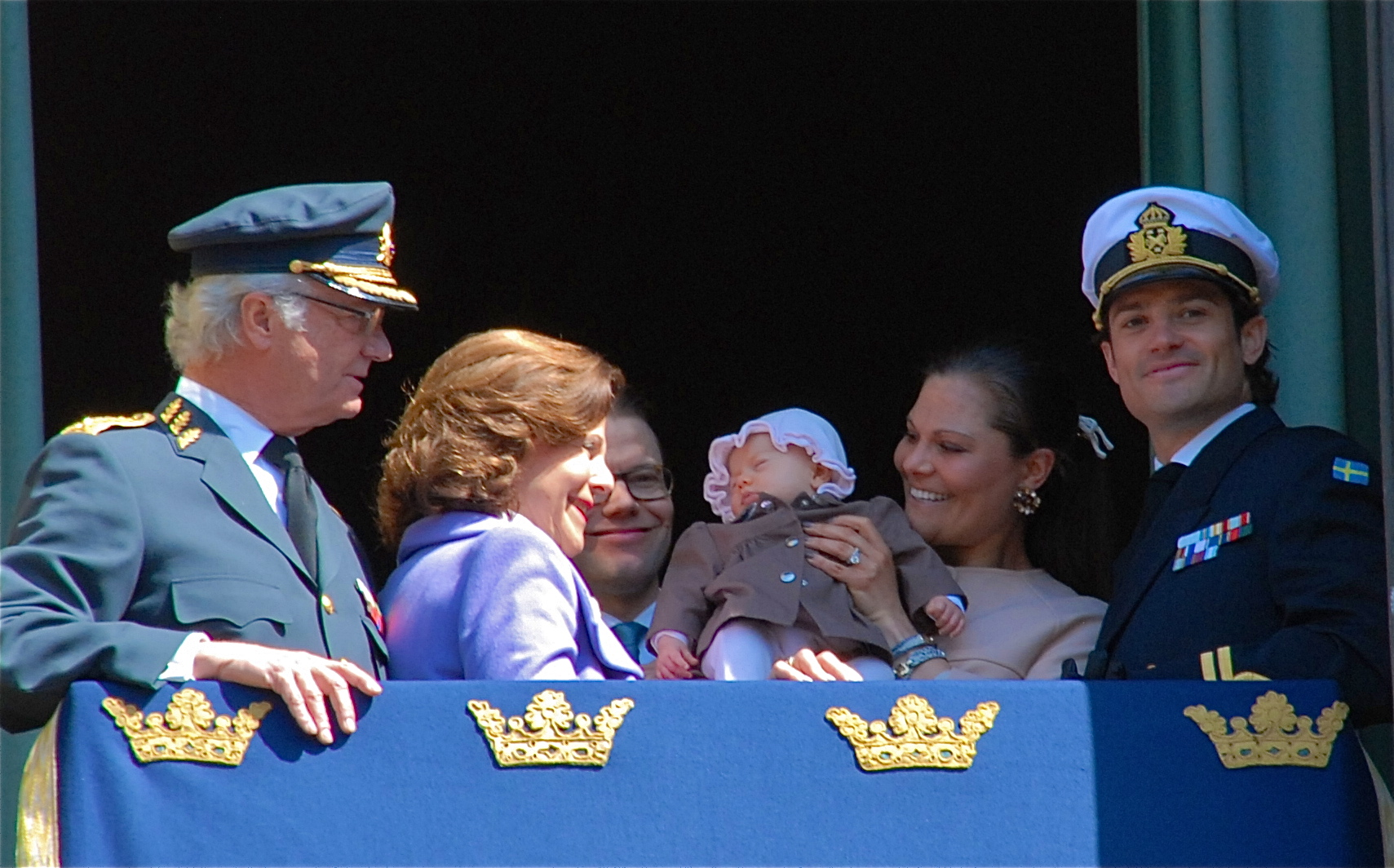
The royal family appearing on the balcony of the Royal Palace for the king's 66th birthday, 30 April 2012

As head of state, he is the foremost representative of Sweden and pays state visits abroad and receives those to Sweden; he opens the annual session of the Riksdag, chairs the Special Council held during a change of Government (skifteskonselj), holds regular Information Councils with the Prime Minister and the Cabinet (informationskonselj), chairs the meetings of the Advisory Council on Foreign Affairs (utrikesnämnden), receives letters of credence of foreign ambassadors to Sweden and signs those of Sweden to foreign nations, and annually presents the Nobel Prizes (Note: Excepting the Nobel Peace Prize, which is awarded by the King of Norway.) and the Polar Music Prize. As a figurehead, he also voluntarily abstains from voting in Swedish elections.

Carl Gustaf holds the highest ranks in the three branches of the Swedish Armed Forces; this is due to the fact that he was, as stipulated by § 14 of the 1809 Instrument of Government in effect at the time of his accession to the throne in 1973, the Commander-in-Chief (Swedish: Högste Befälhavare; not to be confused with the military professional holding the position of Supreme Commander) and therefore he was promoted ex officio from his earlier ranks of captain (Army & Air Force) and lieutenant (Navy), to general and admiral. Under the provisions of the Instrument of Government of 1974, which became effective on 1 January 1975, the King no longer holds this constitutionally-mandated position, but he retained his ranks à la suite since he no longer has any military command authority, except over His Majesty's Military Staff.

On 26 April 2018, Carl Gustaf became the longest-reigning Swedish monarch when he surpassed Magnus Eriksson's reign of 44 years and 222 days.

Carl Gustaf's Golden Jubilee was celebrated in 2023. The celebrations included tours of all of Sweden's 21 counties, a jubilee banquet at the Royal Palace and a carriage procession through the streets of Stockholm. From 2018 onwards, criticism of Carl Gustaf and the development of the monarchy increased. Support for the monarchy overall remained strong in the Swedish public, however, in large part due to the popularity of Crown Princess Victoria.

Following the abdication of his cousin, Margrethe II of Denmark, Carl Gustaf became the longest-serving incumbent head of state in Europe. His reign saw Sweden end over 200 years of neutrality by joining NATO on 18 March 2024.

== Views ==
Carl Gustaf has made a number of statements that have been regarded as political or controversial. In 1989, he criticised Norway's seal hunting policy, saying that "if [prime minister] Gro Harlem Brundtland cannot take care of the seal problems, I wonder how she will be able to take care of the Norwegian people". In 2004, after a state visit to Brunei, he praised Sultan Hassanal Bolkiah and described Brunei as an "open country", despite its controversial human rights record. In 2023, Carl Gustaf said that while he understood that Brunei has a non-democratic form of government, it was still an open country.

Following the 2004 Indian Ocean earthquake and tsunami, in which many Swedes died, then-prime minister Göran Persson had failed to carry out his constitutional obligation to inform the king on matters of state, resulting in criticism of his government. During a memorial ceremony held at Stockholm City Hall on 10 January 2005, the king gave a widely praised speech following the disaster.

In 2015, Carl Gustaf offered to assist in resolving a diplomatic crisis between Sweden and Saudi Arabia, which began when foreign minister Margot Wallström criticised Saudi Arabia's form of government and human rights situation. Saudi Arabia responded by recalling its ambassador to Sweden and ending a military co-operation agreement between the two nations. The Swedish government then reportedly asked Carl Gustaf to write a letter to the Saudi Arabian king, which ended the crisis. In 2016, Carl Gustaf said that the letter he wrote played a role in resolving the dispute with Saudi Arabia and added that he had "good relations" with the Saudi king, which led to criticism.

In 2016, Carl Gustaf intervened in a debate surrounding the proposed Nobel Center at Blasieholmen in central Stockholm, near the Nationalmuseum and old town, saying that the proposed structure was "too big and in the wrong place" and that it "could be relocated". Following the 2018 election, the City of Stockholm abandoned the original proposal, opting instead for creating new plans near Slussen.

In December 2020, Carl Gustaf said that Sweden "failed" to save lives with its approach to dealing with the COVID-19 pandemic, which involved not imposing a full national lockdown.

In March 2022, the King condemned the Russian invasion of Ukraine during a visit to the Life Regiment Hussars to present a new standard to the regiment. He stated that Europe was in an extremely difficult situation and accused Russia of violating international law and creating a humanitarian catastrophe.

In 2023, the Nobel Foundation announced that they intended to invite ambassadors from Russia, Belarus and Iran to attend that year's Nobel Prize awards ceremony. This sparked mass criticism and the royal court issued a statement saying the king was still deciding on whether or not to attend the ceremony, as has been tradition since it was first held. Many leaders of political parties also threatened to boycott the ceremony. Eventually the Foundation backed down on its decision.

During a ceremony held outside the Riksdag building to mark Sweden's accession to NATO in 2024, Carl Gustaf described the move to join the alliance as a new era in Swedish security policy and reaffirmed Sweden's wish for peace. At the 2025 Society and Defence National Conference in Sälen, Carl Gustaf addressed Sweden's security situation. He said that whilst Sweden was not at war it could no longer consider itself at peace, echoing a sentiment voiced by prime minister Ulf Kristersson. He also highlighted the need for societal preparedness and stated that he believed the public's willingness to defend the realm had grown in recent years.

== Personal life ==
=== Personal interests ===
Carl Gustaf has an interest in environmental issues, technology, agriculture, trade, and industry. He has a keen interest in automobiles. He owns several Porsche 911s, a car model which is said to be a particular favourite of his, as well as a vintage Volvo PV444, a Ferrari 456M GT, an AC Cobra and other cars. The first pictures taken of him and his future wife were of them sitting in his Porsche 911. In the summer of 2005, he was involved in a traffic accident in Norrköping, which was described as a "fender bender", with no serious personal injuries. The incident caused significant media attention. Carl Gustaf and Silvia have attended several Summer and Winter Olympic Games.

==== Scouting ====
Carl Gustaf is the honorary chairman of the World Scout Foundation, and often participates in scout activities both in Sweden and abroad. He regularly visits World Scout Jamborees, for instance the 1979 Dalajamb World Jamboree International Encampment hosted by Sweden, the 2002 World Jamboree held in Sattahip, Thailand, and the 100th Anniversary of World Scouting 2007 World Jamboree held in Hylands Park, England. He also attended the 1981 National Scout Jamboree in Virginia, United States, and was awarded the Bronze Wolf, the only distinction of the World Organization of the Scout Movement, awarded by the World Scout Committee for exceptional services to world Scouting, in 1982. He also attended the 22nd World Scout Jamboree. He gave a speech on 6 August 2011 at the closing ceremony with more than 40,000 people watching. King Carl Gustaf made an appearance at the 2013 Boy Scouts of America National Jamboree in West Virginia.

=== Marriage and family ===
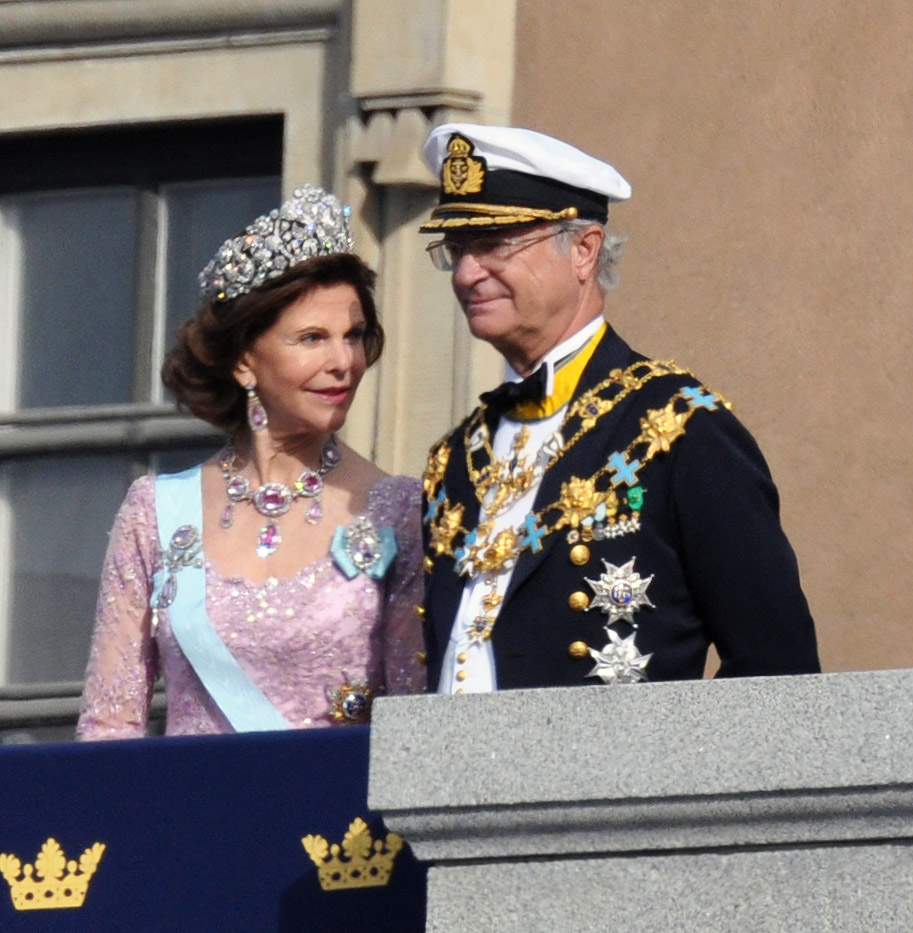
King Carl XVI Gustaf with Queen Silvia at the royal wedding of their daughter Victoria

Carl Gustaf met Silvia Sommerlath, an interpreter and host born to a German father and a Brazilian mother, at the 1972 Summer Olympics in Munich. They married on 19 June 1976, at Stockholm Cathedral, in a ceremony officiated by the Archbishop of Uppsala, Olof Sundby. The wedding was preceded by a Royal Variety Performance the previous evening, during which the Swedish musical group ABBA gave one of the first performances of "Dancing Queen", as a tribute to Sweden's future queen.

Carl Gustaf and Silvia's first joint state visit was to the Netherlands on 25 October 1976. In 1980, Carl Gustaf and his family moved to Drottningholm Palace west of Stockholm, although they continue to perform their official working duties at the Royal Palace of Stockholm.

King Carl Gustaf and Queen Silvia have three children and nine grandchildren:

- Crown Princess Victoria, Duchess of Västergötland (born 14 July 1977), who is married to Daniel Westling and has two children
- Prince Carl Philip, Duke of Värmland (born 13 May 1979), who is married to Sofia Hellqvist and has four children
- Princess Madeleine, Duchess of Hälsingland and Gästrikland (born 10 June 1982), who is married to Christopher O'Neill and has three children

Prince Carl Philip was born the heir apparent. However, a constitutional reform, which was already underway at the time of his birth, made his elder sister, Victoria, the heir apparent and Crown Princess of Sweden when it took effect on 1 January 1980, making Sweden the first monarchy to adopt absolute primogeniture for its line of succession. Carl Gustaf later criticised the change, arguing that his son had lost the position and title he had held from birth as a result of the reform.

On 3 November 2010 the Swedish newspaper Aftonbladet published excerpts from a book about the Swedish King Carl XVI Gustaf, Den motvillige monarken ("The Reluctant Monarch"), claiming that he had a year-long love affair with pop singer Camilla Henemark in the late 1990s.

=== Health ===
In February 2023, Carl Gustaf underwent "a surgical intervention with catheter technology in the heart area."

== Use of remaining power ==
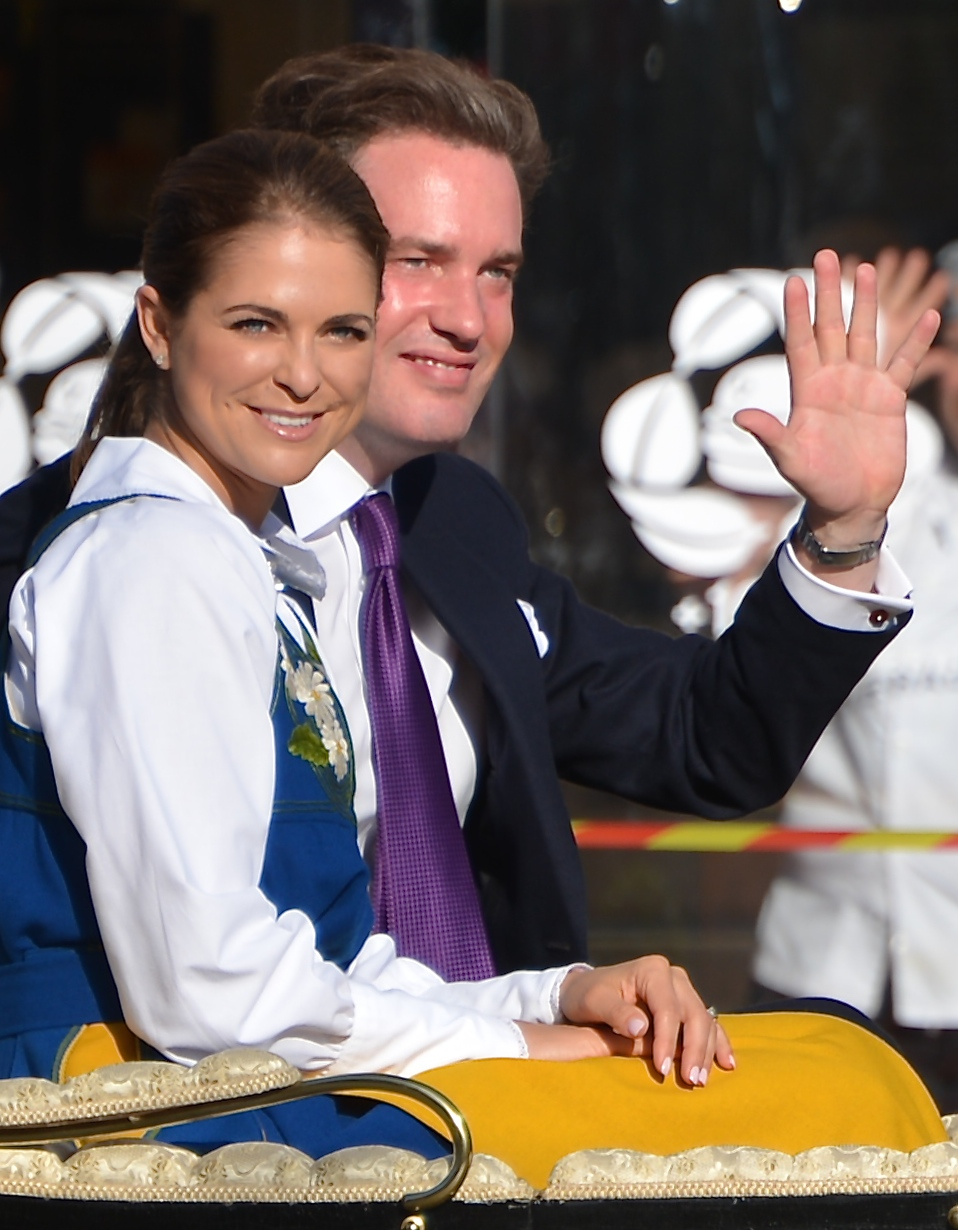
Carl Gustaf created a new Swedish double duchy for his daughter Princess Madeleine (left) in 1982, whereas her husband in 2013 declined the king's offer to become a Swedish prince and duke, and is styled Herr Christopher O'Neill in Sweden.

As head of the House of Bernadotte, Carl Gustaf has made a number of decisions regarding royal titles, styles and positions within the Swedish royal family since his accession in 1973.

- 1974: his sister Christina married a non-royal Swedish man and Carl Gustaf followed the example which his grandfather and predecessor had set for two of Christina's older sisters with like marriages, so Christina was removed from the Royal House, no longer a Royal Highness and was given the courtesy title Princess Christina, Mrs. Magnuson (a special non-royal, non-noble style first invented in 1953 by King Haakon VII of Norway for his granddaughter Ragnhild).
- 1976: his own choice, taking advantage of his constitutional prerogative as king when he married a non-royal German-Brazilian woman, saw her created Her Majesty Queen Silvia of Sweden.
- 1976: his paternal uncle Bertil (later that year) married the non-royal British woman who had lived with Bertil for decades, and (with Bertil's titles) Carl Gustaf created her a Royal Highness Princess of Sweden and Duchess of Halland.
- 1977: his daughter Victoria was born, and in 1980, Carl Gustaf created her Duchess of Västergötland (which has had duchesses before).
- 1979: his son Carl Philip was born, and Carl Gustaf created him Duke of Värmland (which has had dukes before).
- 1982: his daughter Madeleine was born, and Carl Gustaf created a new duchy for her as Duchess of Hälsingland and Gästrikland.
- 1983: his paternal uncle Sigvard, who had ceased to be Prince of Sweden in 1934 following his marriage to a non-royal German woman, supported by legal experts announced his own title as Prince Sigvard Bernadotte, 18 years later clearly citing a great-uncle Prince Oscar Bernadotte's title as his main precedent; however, Sigvard died in 2002 with Carl Gustaf never having responded to his uncle's statement, and with the Royal Court of Sweden consistently refusing to honor it.
- 2003: his paternal grandfather's first cousin Carl died, and Carl Gustaf formally recognized his Belgian title by allowing Prince Carl Bernadotte on the gravestone at the Royal Cemetery which is owned by the king; in 2014 he did the same there, allowing Carl's widow's name as Princess Kristine Bernadotte when she died.
- 2010: his daughter Victoria married a non-royal Swede whom Carl Gustaf created a Royal Highness Prince of Sweden and (with her title) Duke of Västergötland.
- 2012: his granddaughter Estelle was born and created Duchess of Östergötland (which has had duchesses before).
- 2013: his daughter Madeleine married a non-royal British American who declined Swedish citizenship, and Carl Gustaf gave him the special courtesy title of Herr (with a capital h).
- 2014: his granddaughter Leonore was born and created Duchess of Gotland (which also previously has been a duchy).
- 2015: his son Carl Philip married a non-royal Swede whom Carl Gustaf created a Royal Highness Princess of Sweden and (with the son's title) Duchess of Värmland.
- 2015: his grandson Nicolas was born, and Carl Gustaf created a new duchy for him as Duke of Ångermanland.
- 2016: his grandson Oscar was born and created Duke of Scania (which has had dukes before).
- 2016: his grandson Alexander was born (later that year) and created Duke of Södermanland (which has had dukes before).
- 2017: his grandson Gabriel was born and created Duke of Dalarna (which has had dukes before).
- 2018: his granddaughter Adrienne was born, and Carl Gustaf created a new duchy for her as Duchess of Blekinge.
- 2019: Carl Gustaf issued a statement rescinding the royal status of his grandchildren Leonore, Nicolas, Alexander, Gabriel and Adrienne in an effort to more strictly associate Swedish royalty to the office of the head of state; the five are still to be styled as princes/princesses and dukes/duchesses of their provinces, and they remain in the line of succession to the throne.
- 2021: his grandson Julian was born and created Duke of Halland (which has had dukes before) with the same standing of 2019 as his elder brothers.
- 2025: his granddaughter Ines was born and created Duchess of Västerbotten with the same standing of 2019 as her elder brothers.

== Titles, styles, honours and arms ==
Royal monogram

Carl XVI Gustaf ended the centuries-old traditional style "King of Sweden, the Goths and the Wends", instead choosing the simpler title "King of Sweden" (Sveriges konung). His personal motto is "For Sweden – with the times" (För Sverige – i tiden).

Carl Gustaf and his immediate family do not use a surname. The national census, maintained by the Swedish Tax Agency, has only an asterisk (Carl Gustaf Folke Hubertus *) as their surname.

=== Regnal name ===
There have been only ten historical kings of Sweden named "Charles" (Swedish: Carl). The numeral "sixteenth" stems from an erroneous genealogy that includes fictitious kings, created by 16th-century writer Johannes Magnus.

=== Arms ===
On his creation as Duke of Jämtland, Carl XVI Gustaf was granted an achievement of arms which featured the arms of Jämtland in base (these arms can be seen on his stallplate as knight of the Danish Order of the Elephant at Frederiksborg Palace). Since his accession to the throne, he has used the greater coat of arms of Sweden although he remains associated with the ducal title of Jämtland that he held as a prince.

| Arms of Carl Gustaf as Duke of Jämtland from 1950 to his accession |
| Arms of dominion of Carl XVI Gustaf as king |

=== Distinctions ===
==== National ====
- Sweden: Recipient of the 90th Birthday Medal of King Gustaf V
- Sweden: Recipient of the 85th Birthday Medal of King Gustaf VI Adolf
- Sweden: Recipient of the Wedding Medal of Crown Princess Victoria to Daniel Westling

==== Foreign ====
- Argentina: Collar of the Order of the Liberator General San Martín (1998)
- Austria: Grand Star of the Order of Honour for Services to the Republic of Austria, Special Class (1967)
- Belgium: Grand Cordon of the Order of Leopold (1977)
- Brazil: Grand Collar of the National Order of the Southern Cross (2007)
- Brunei: Recipient of the Royal Family Order of the Crown of Brunei (2004)
- Bulgaria: Sash of the Order of Stara Planina
- Chile: Collar of the Order of Merit
- Croatia: Grand Cross of the Grand Order of King Tomislav (2013)
- Denmark:
  - Knight with Collar of the Order of the Elephant (12 January 1965)
  - Grand Commander of the Order of the Dannebrog (1975)
- Egypt: Collar of the Order of the Nile
- Estonia:
  - Collar of the Order of the Cross of Terra Mariana (1995)
  - Collar of the Order of the White Star (2011)
- Finland: Grand Cross with Collar of the Order of the White Rose of Finland (1974)
- France: Grand Cross of the National Order of the Legion of Honour
- Germany:
  - Grand Cross special class of the Order of Merit of the Federal Republic of Germany
  - Ducal Family of Saxe-Coburg and Gotha: Grand Cross of the Ducal Royal Saxe-Ernestine Saxe-Coburg and Gotha House Order
- Greece: Grand Cross of the Order of the Redeemer
- Holy See: Knight with the Collar of the Order of Pope Pius IX
- Hungary: Grand Cross (Military Division) of the Order of Merit of the Republic of Hungary
- Iceland: Collar with Grand Cross Breast Star of the Order of the Falcon
- Indonesia: Star of the Republic of Indonesia, 1st Class (2017)
- Italy: Knight Grand Cross with Collar of the Order of Merit of the Italian Republic (1991)
- Japan: Collar of the Supreme Order of the Chrysanthemum
- Jordan: Collar of the Order of al-Hussein bin Ali
- Latvia:
  - Grand Cross with Chain of the Order of the Three Stars (1995)
  - Grand Cross of the Order of Viesturs
- Lithuania: Grand Cross with Golden Chain of the Order of Vytautas the Great (1995)
- Luxembourg: Knight of the Order of the Gold Lion of the House of Nassau
- Malaysia: Honorary Recipient of the Order of the Crown of the Realm (1996)
- Mexico: Collar of the Mexican Order of the Aztec Eagle (2004)
- Netherlands:
  - Knight Grand Cross of the Order of the Netherlands Lion
  - Grand Cross of the Order of the House of Orange
  - Commander of the Order of the Golden Ark
- Norway: Grand Cross with Collar of the Royal Norwegian Order of Saint Olav (1974)
- Poland: Knight of the Order of the White Eagle
- Portugal:
  - Grand Collar of the Military Order of Saint James of the Sword
  - Grand Collar of the Order of Prince Henry (1987)
- Romania: Collar of the Order of the Star of Romania (2003)
- Saudi Arabia: Collar of the Order of Abdulaziz al Saud
- Slovakia: First Class of the Order of the White Double Cross
- Slovenia: Recipient of the Decoration for Exceptional Merits
- South Africa: Grand Collar of the Order of Good Hope (1997)
- South Korea: Recipient of the Grand Order of Mugunghwa (2012)
- Spain:
  - 1,183rd Knight of the Order of the Golden Fleece (1983)
  - Knight of the Collar of the Royal and Distinguished Spanish Order of Charles III
- Thailand:
  - Knight of the Most Auspicious Order of the Rajamitrabhorn (2003)
  - Knight of the Order of Symbolic Propitiousness Ramkeerati (2008)
- Tunisia: Grand Cordon of the Order of the Republic
- Turkey: Recipient of the Order of the State of Republic of Turkey (2013)
- Ukraine:
  - Member of the Order of Liberty (2008)
  - First Class of the Order of Prince Yaroslav the Wise
  - First Class of the Order of Merit, 1st Class
- United Kingdom:
  - Stranger Knight Companion of the Most Noble Order of the Garter (1983)
  - Recipient of the Royal Victorian Chain (8 July 1975)
- Yugoslavia: Order of the Yugoslav Great Star (1976)

=== Awards ===
==== Foreign ====
- United Nations Peace Medal (1976)
- World Organization of the Scout Movement: Bronze Wolf Award (1982)
- Japan: Golden Pheasant Award of the Scout Association of Japan (1980)
- Philippines: Mount Makiling Award

=== Honorary military positions ===
- (United Kingdom) Honorary Admiral, British Royal Navy (seniority: 25 June 1975)

== Patronages ==
- African Medical and Research Foundation Sweden (AMREF)
- Allmänna Idrottsklubben (AIK)
- Barnens Dags Riksförbund
- Swedish Central Association for Sports Promotion (Centralföreningen för Idrottens Främjande i Sverige)
- Djurgårdens Hembygdsförening
- Friends of the Nationalmuseum
- Friends of the Swedish Museum of Natural History
- Swedish Outdoor Association (Friluftsfrämjandet)
- Society of the Friends of the Swedish Institute at Athens (Föreningen Svenska Atheninstitutets Vänner)
- Föreningen Konstnärernas Vänner
- Swedes Worldwide (Föreningen för Svenskar i Världen)
- Gastronomic Academy (Gastronomiska Akademien)
- Global Child Forum
- Gripsholmsföreningen
- Idrottsföreningen Kamraterna (IFK)
- Kulturen i Lund
- Royal Automobile Club
- Kungliga Motorbåt Klubben
- Royal Swedish Aero Club
- Royal Swedish Yacht Club
- Swedish Cancer Society (Riksföreningen mot Cancer)
- Royal Physiographic Society in Lund
- Royal Society of Sciences and Letters in Gothenburg
- Royal Society of Sciences in Uppsala
- Royal Swedish Academy
- Royal Swedish Academy of Agriculture and Forestry
- Royal Swedish Academy of Arts
- Royal Swedish Academy of Engineering Sciences
- Royal Swedish Academy of Letters, History and Antiquities
- Royal Swedish Academy of Music
- Royal Swedish Academy of Sciences, and its annual King Carl XVI Gustaf Professorship in Environmental Science
- Royal Swedish Society of Naval Sciences (first honorary member, 1968)
- Royal Swedish Academy of War Sciences
- Save the Visby Ringwall Campaign
- The Natural Step Foundation
- Association of Friends of the Drottningholm Court Theatre (Stiftelsen Drottningholmsteaterns Vänner)
- Keep Sweden Tidy Foundation (Stiftelsen Håll Sverige Rent)
- Stockholm Water Foundation
- Stiftelsen Svenska Flaggan
- Stiftelsen Svensk Våtmarksfond
- Stockholms Konserthusstiftelse
- Stockholm Academic Male Chorus
- Svea Orden
- Swedish Archaeological Association (Svenska Arkeologiska Samfundet)
- Swedish Women's Auxiliary Veterinary Corps (Svenska Blå Stjärnan)
- Swedish Society for the Protection of Animals (Svenska Djurskyddsföreningen)
- Swedish Association for Hunting and Wildlife Management (Svenska Jägareförbundet)
- Swedish Kennel Club (Svenska Kennelklubben)
- Educational Swedish Swimming Association (Svenska Livräddningssällskapet – Simfrämjandet)
- Svenska Motionsdagen (Korpen Svenska Motionsidrottsförbundet)
- Association of Friends of the Swedish Institute in Rome (Svenska Rominstitutets Vänner)
- Swedish Tourist Association
- The Guides and Scouts of Sweden
- Swedish Society for Anthropology and Geography
- Sweden–America Foundation
- Swedish General Art Society (Sveriges Allmänna Konstförening)
- Sveriges Hembygdsförbund
- Swedish Forestry Association (Sveriges Skogsvårdsförbund)
- Swedish Bible Society
- Swedish Colonial Society
- Swedish Lions
- Swedish Red Cross
- Swedish Rotary
- Swedish Sports Confederation
- Sångsällskapet Orphei Drängar
- The Natural Step
- The American-Scandinavian Foundation
- Wilhelm Peterson-Berger Society
- World Scout Foundation
- World Wide Fund for Nature Sweden (WWF)
- Friends of the Museum of Far Eastern Antiquities (Östasiatiska Museets Vänner)

== Ancestry ==
Ancestors of Carl XVI Gustaf

8. Gustaf V of Sweden
4. Gustaf VI Adolf of Sweden
9. Victoria of Baden
2. Gustaf Adolf, Duke of Västerbotten
10. Arthur, Duke of Connaught and Strathearn
5. Margaret of Connaught
11. Louise Margaret of Prussia
1. Carl XVI Gustaf of Sweden
12. Leopold, Duke of Albany
6. Charles Edward, Duke of Saxe-Coburg and Gotha
13. Helen of Waldeck and Pyrmont
3. Sibylla of Saxe-Coburg and Gotha
14. Friedrich Ferdinand, Duke of Schleswig-Holstein
7. Victoria Adelaide of Schleswig-Holstein
15. Caroline Mathilde of Schleswig-Holstein-Sonderburg-Augustenburg

Carl XVI Gustaf House of Bernadotte Born: 30 April 1946
Swedish royalty
| Preceded by Gustaf Adolf | Crown Prince of Sweden; 1950–1973 | Vacant Title next held by Carl Philip |
Regnal titles
| Preceded by Gustaf VI Adolf | King of Sweden; 1973–present | Incumbent; Heir apparent: Victoria |
