= Shaikha Al Maskari =

Emirati businesswoman (born 1939)

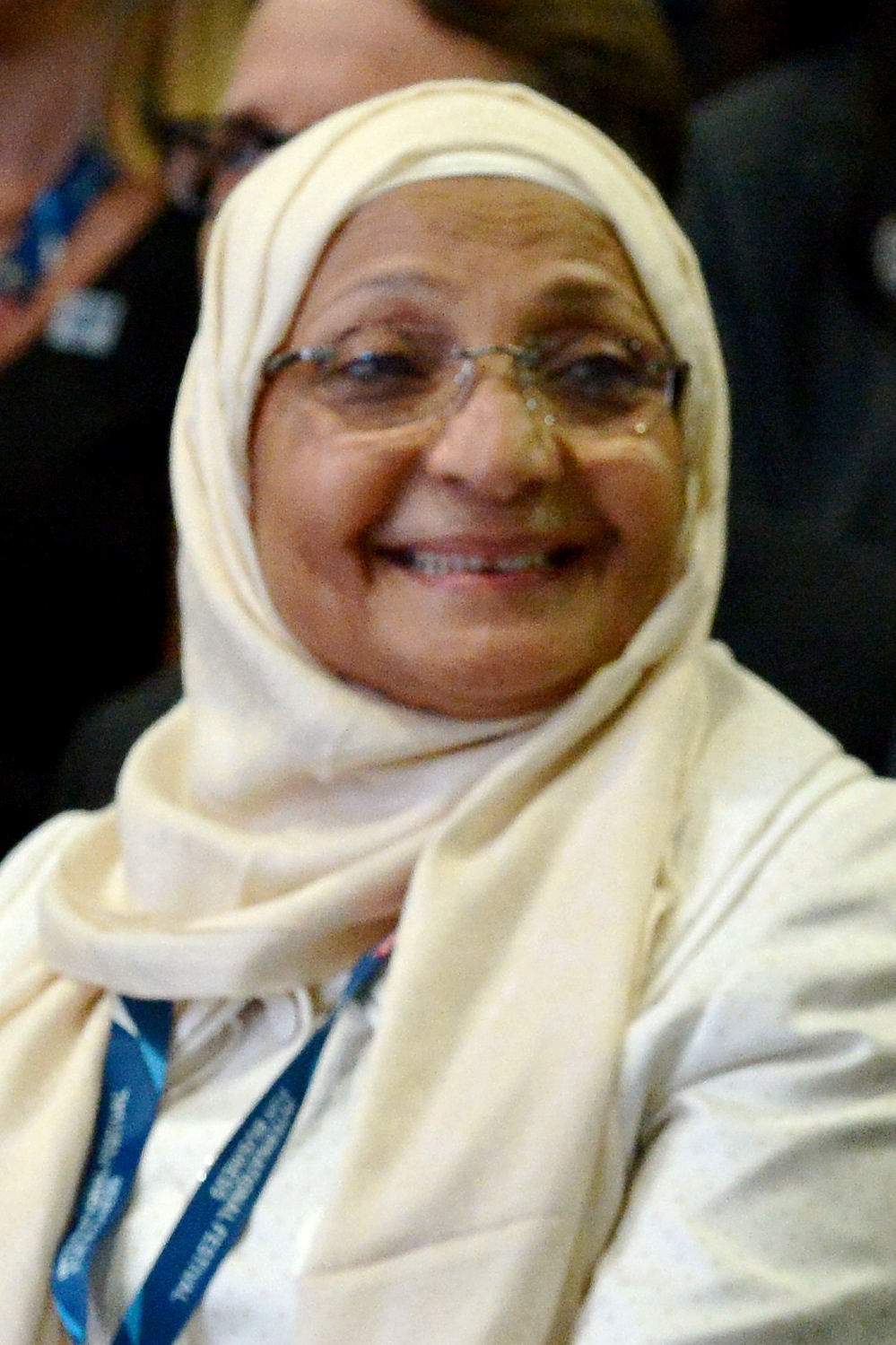
- Born: Shaikha Ali Salem Al Maskari; 1939 (age 86–87); Al Ain, United Arab Emirates
- Education: University of London; Indiana University
- Occupations: Businesswoman; Geophysicist
- Spouse: Donald Henry Hase
- Children: 3

Shaikha Ali Salem Al Maskari (Arabic: شيخة المسكري, born 1939) is an Emirati geophysicist, businesswoman, and the chairperson of Al Maskari Holding.

== Early life and education ==
Al Maskari was born in Al Ain in the United Arab Emirates. She earned a bachelor's degree from the University of London, and a Ph.D. in geology from Indiana University.

== Career ==
Al Maskari began her career at Abu Dhabi National Oil Company (ADNOC) in 1974. Her job involved reviewing and reporting on the studies and surveys of the oil and gas fields. She left the company in 1989 and joined her family petroleum company Al Maskaria Establishment, which was founded by her mother Sheikha Azza Bint Saif Al Maskari, and in 2008 was reorganized into Al Maskari Holding.

== Awards and recognition ==
In 2016, she received Sweden's Royal Order of the Polar Star, First Class for building bridges between Sweden and the United Arab Emirates in the form of organizing exchange programs for Emirati medical students with the University of Gothenburg in the late 1980.

In 2018, she was listed in Forbes list of the 100 most influential women in the Middle East at number 70.

In 2019, Al Maskari received the Golden Peacock Global Award for Lifetime Achievement in Business and Social Leadership.

== Philanthropy ==
Al Maskari practices philanthropy through her private foundation and in coordination with the Emirates Red Crescent.

== Personal life ==
Al Maskari was married to Donald Henry Hase, a geology professor at the University of Iowa, and they had three children together. Her husband died in 1990.
