= Sanda Ojiambo =

Kenyan administrator

- Born: Kenya
- Citizenship: Kenya
- Education: McGill University (Bachelor of Arts in Economics and International Development); University of Minnesota (Master of Arts in Public Policy)
- Occupation: Administrator
- Title: Head of United Nations Global Compact

Sanda Ojiambo is a Kenyan administrator who serves as the Assistant Secretary-General of the United Nations and CEO and Executive Director of the United Nations Global Compact. She has served as CEO and Executive Director since June 2020 and was appointed Assistant Secretary-General in April 2022, succeeding Lise Kingo of Denmark.

== Background and education ==
Ojiambo was born in Kenya and she attended local schools for her primary and secondary education. She holds a Bachelor of Arts degree in Economics and International Development obtained from McGill University, in Montreal, Quebec, Canada. Her degree of Master of Arts in Public Policy, was obtained from the University of Minnesota, in Minneapolis.

== Career ==
In 1997, Ojiambo started working for CARE International in Somalia. From there she joined the United Nations Development Programme, also in Somalia. She spent a total of five years in Somalia, leading programmes in areas including education, safe motherhood, environmental conservation, governance and Landmines demining.

She then relocated to the Africa Regional Office of International Planned Parenthood Federation (IPPF), located in Nairobi, Kenya. There, she provided technical advice for "service delivery, accreditation standards, financial management, governance and advocacy". Her service area covered 40 countries. She worked in that capacity for another five years.

In 2008, Ojiambo joined Safaricom Plc, the largest telecommunications company in Kenya. She started out as the senior manager of Safaricom and MPESA Foundations. She led the implementation of several public-private partnership initiatives between Safaricom and the United Nations organizations.

In 2010, she was appointed head of Sustainable Business and Social Impact at Safaricom. Ojiambo leads the Corporate Responsibility Department, which coordinates the integration of the Sustainable Development Goals (SDGs), sustainability reporting, technology for development products and the Safaricom and MPESA Foundations. Her team delivered regular reports of their work. This raised a great amount of interest among stakeholders.

== Other considerations ==
Before her appointment to head the UN Global Compact, Ojiambo sat on the board of directors for these companies:

- Kenya Investment Authority, a parastatal
- Gender Violence Recovery Centre, an NGO that provides services to survivors of gender violence
- Global Development Incubator, an international social enterprise aiming to drive the adoption of technology for development
- Care Pay Limited, a health payments company

She also serves on the board of governors at Mpesa Foundation Academy.
