= Queen Silvia of Sweden =

Queen of Sweden since 1976

Silvia
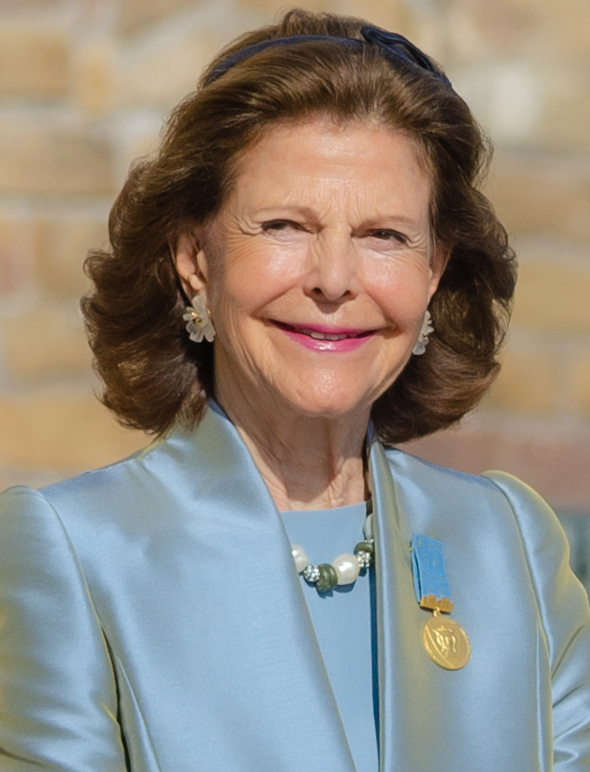
- Silvia in 2023

Queen consort of Sweden
- Tenure: 19 June 1976 – present
- Born: Silvia Renate Sommerlath; 23 December 1943 (age 82); Heidelberg, Germany
- Spouse: Carl XVI Gustaf (m. 1976)
- Issue: Crown Princess Victoria; Prince Carl Philip; Princess Madeleine
- Father: Walther Sommerlath
- Mother: Alice Soares de Toledo
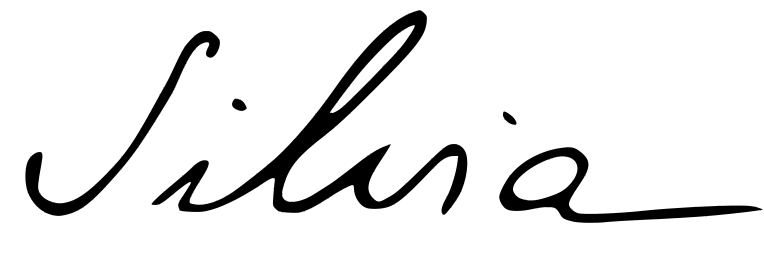
- Signature

Silvia (born Silvia Renate Sommerlath; 23 December 1943) is Queen of Sweden as the wife of King Carl XVI Gustaf. She has held this title since her marriage to Carl XVI Gustaf in 1976. The king and queen have three children: Crown Princess Victoria, Prince Carl Philip, and Princess Madeleine.

== Childhood and parentage ==
Silvia Renate Sommerlath was born in Heidelberg, Germany, on 23 December 1943, the only daughter of Alice (née Soares de Toledo) and Walther Sommerlath. Her father was German and her mother Brazilian. She has three brothers: Ralf (born 1929), Walther, who died in 2020, and Jörg, who died in 2006.

Silvia was four years old when her family moved to Brazil, where she spent her childhood. She studied at Colégio Visconde de Porto Seguro in São Paulo and used to spend holidays in the countryside, among her mother's family in São Manuel. Silvia often makes low-profile visits to Brazil and still keeps in touch with her relatives. She is known for her love for jabuticaba, a Brazilian native fruit, and keeps a jabuticaba tree in the Royal Palace.

When she was 13, the family moved back to Germany, in 1957. She attended grammar school in Düsseldorf, finishing her Abitur in 1963. She attended the Munich School of Interpreting from 1965 to 1969, majoring in Spanish. She also speaks French and English in addition to her native German and Portuguese, making Swedish her sixth language. She worked for a time at the Argentine consulate in Munich.

She has some fluency in Swedish Sign Language, a national sign language used by the deaf community in Sweden.

== Marriage and family ==
During the 1972 Summer Olympics, Sommerlath met Crown Prince Carl Gustaf. At the time, she was leading a marketing campaign for the city of Munich. Sommerlath and the other Olympic hostesses wore sky-blue dirndls to promote Bavarian cultural identity. Under Swedish law at the time, a prince who married a commoner forfeited all right to the throne; however, this prohibition did not apply to the king. After the death of King Gustaf VI Adolf on 15 September 1973, Carl XVI Gustaf succeeded to the throne.

He and Sommerlath announced their engagement on 12 March 1976 and were married three months later on 19 June 1976 in Stockholm Cathedral. It was the first marriage of a reigning Swedish monarch since 1797. The wedding was preceded the evening before by a Royal Variety Performance, where the Swedish musical group ABBA performed "Dancing Queen" for the first time as a tribute to Sweden's future queen.

The King and Queen have three children and nine grandchildren:

- Crown Princess Victoria, Duchess of Västergötland (born 14 July 1977), who is married to Daniel Westling and has two children
- Prince Carl Philip, Duke of Värmland (born 13 May 1979), who is married to Sofia Hellqvist and has four children
- Princess Madeleine, Duchess of Hälsingland and Gästrikland, (born 10 June 1982), who is married to Christopher O'Neill and has three children

In February 2021, Silvia was taken to hospital after she fractured her right wrist in a fall.

== Father's Nazi links ==
In July 2002, the Queen became the subject of international curiosity when an article published in the syndicalist newspaper Arbetaren reported that German state archives recorded that the Queen's father, Walther Sommerlath, joined the Nazi party's foreign wing, the NSDAP/AO, in 1934, when he was living in Brazil and working for a German steel company. In December 2010, Queen Silvia wrote a letter of complaint to Jan Scherman, the CEO of TV4, the network that had aired a documentary about her father's alleged Nazi past.

Queen Silvia commissioned a report from World War II expert Erik Norberg, a choice that was criticised due to Norberg having ties to the royal family. In his report, Norberg said that the Queen's father had in fact helped the owner of the steel-fabrication plant, a Jewish businessperson, escape from Germany by taking over the factory. In a December 2011 interview for Sweden's public service broadcaster Sveriges Television, Silvia called the media's handling of the information about her father "character assassination".

== Charity involvement ==
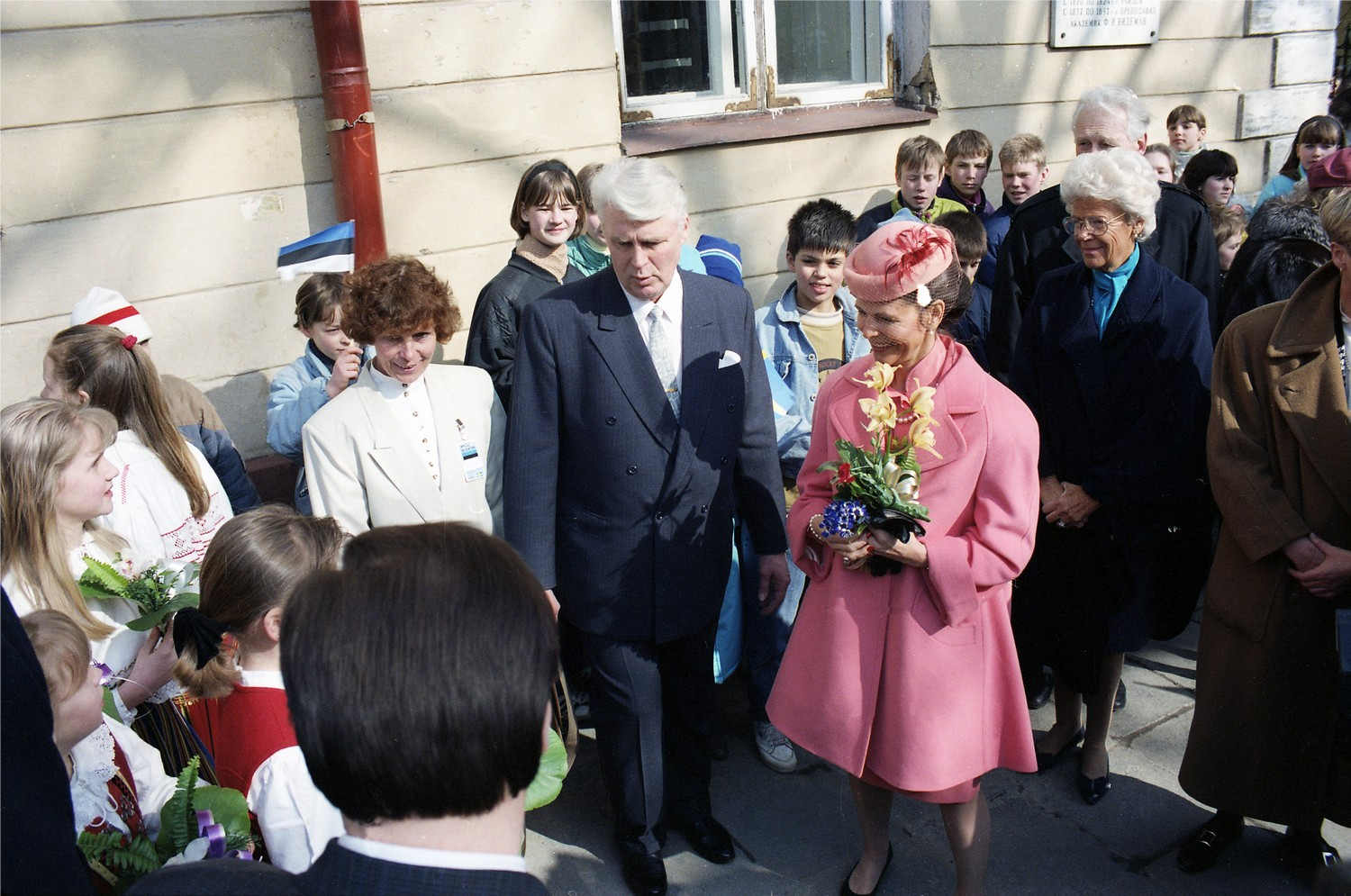
Queen Silvia visits Gustav Adolfi Gümnaasium in Tallinn, Estonia, in 1992.

Queen Silvia established Mentor International in 1994 in collaboration with the World Health Organization. Her vision was to offer mentoring as inspiration, empowerment, and motivation for young people to make healthy life choices and view their futures more positively. Mentor's work has been recognized by the United Nations Office on Drugs & Crime, the Organization of American States, and the Council of Europe. She is now an honorary board member of Mentor Foundation.

She was also a co-founder of the World Childhood Foundation in 1999, having been inspired by her work as Patron of the first World Congress against Commercial Sexual Exploitation of Children held in Stockholm. She has also been involved in the Global Child Forum, which she helped initiate, as a keynote speaker in several forums.

Her commitment to the work with dementia and the care of the elderly at the end of life is also well known and respected. On her initiative, Silviahemmet was established in Stockholm. It works to educate hospital personnel in how to work with people suffering from dementia, and also initiates research in the area.

She chairs the Royal Wedding Fund, which supports research in sports and athletics for disabled young people and the Queen Silvia Jubilee Fund for research on children and disability.

Queen Silvia holds honorary positions in the Swedish Amateur Athletic Association, the Children's Cancer Foundation of Sweden and Save the Children Sweden.

== In popular culture ==
In May 2025, Queen Silvia made a surprise appearance on national television in Sweden to honor entertainer-designer Christer Lindarw in a program about Lindarw's life and career.

== Honours and arms ==
=== National ===
Styles of Queen Silvia
- Reference style: Her Majesty
- Spoken style: Your Majesty

- Sweden:
  - Knight Grand Cross with Collar of the Royal Order of the Seraphim
  - Member of the Royal Family Decoration of King Carl XVI Gustaf
  - Recipient of the Seraphim Medal (2026)
  - Recipient of the 50th Birthday Medal of King Carl XVI Gustaf
  - Recipient of the Wedding Medal of Crown Princess Victoria to Daniel Westling
  - Recipient of the Ruby Jubilee Medal of King Carl XVI Gustaf
  - Recipient of the 70th Birthday Medal of King Carl XVI Gustaf
  - Recipient of the Golden Jubilee Medal of King Carl XVI Gustaf

=== Foreign ===
- Argentina: Grand Cross of the Order of the Liberator General San Martín
- Austria: Grand Star of the Order of Honour for Services to the Republic of Austria
- Belgium: Dame Grand Cross of the Order of Leopold I
- Brazil: Grand Cross of the Order of the Southern Cross
- Brunei: Honorary Dame Grand Cross of the Family Order of Laila Utama
- Bulgaria: Grand Cross of the Order of the Balkan Mountains
- Chile: Grand Cross of the Order of Bernardo O'Higgins
- Croatia: Grand Cross of the Grand Order of Queen Jelena
- Denmark:
  - Knight of the Order of the Elephant (3 September 1985)
  - Recipient of the Silver Anniversary Medal of Queen Margrethe II and Prince Henrik
- Estonia:
  - Grand Cross of the Order of the Cross of Terra Mariana
  - Grand Cross of the Order of the White Star
- Finland: Grand Cross with Collar of the Order of the White Rose of Finland
- Germany:
  - Grand Cross special class of the Order of Merit of the Federal Republic of Germany
  - Baden-Württemberg: Member of the Decoration of Merit
  - Bavaria: Member of the Decoration of Merit
- France:
  - Grand Cross of the Order of the Legion of Honour
  - Grand Cross of the Order of National Merit
- Greece: Grand Cross of the Order of Honour
- Vatican:
  - Dame Grand Cross of the Order of Pope Pius IX
  - Recipient of the Pro Ecclesia et Pontifice
- Hungary: Grand Cross of the Order of Merit of the Republic of Hungary
- Iceland: Grand Cross of the Order of the Falcon
- Italy: Grand Cross of the Order of Merit of the Italian Republic
- Japan: Dame Grand Cordon of the Order of the Precious Crown
- Jordan: Dame Grand Cordon, Special Class of the Order of the Renaissance
- Latvia:
  - Grand Cross of the Order of the Three Stars
  - Grand Cross of the Order of Cross of Recognition
- Lithuania:
  - Grand Cross of the Order of Vytautas the Great
  - Grand Cross of the Order of Merit
- Luxembourg: Dame of the Order of the Gold Lion of the House of Nassau
- Malaysia: Dame Grand Cordon of the Order of the Crown of the Realm
- Mexico: Grand Cross of the Order of the Aztec Eagle
- Netherlands: Dame Grand Cross of the Order of the Lion of the Netherlands
- Norway:
  - Dame Grand Cross of the Order of Saint Olav
  - Recipient of the Silver Jubilee Medal of King Harald V
- Poland: Grand Cross of the Order of the White Eagle (2011)
- Portugal:
  - Grand Cross of the Order of Christ
  - Grand Cross of the Order of Prince Henry
- Romania: Grand Cross of the Order of the Star of Romania
- Slovenia: Member of the Decoration for Exceptional Merits (2004)
- South Korea: Grand Cross of the Order of Diplomatic Service Merit
- Spain:
  - Dame Grand Cross of the Royal Order of Isabella the Catholic (15 October 1979)
  - Dame Grand Cross of the Royal and Distinguished Spanish Order of Charles III (16 November 2021)
- Thailand:
  - Dame Grand Cordon of the Order of Chula Chom Klao (2003)
  - Recipient of the Boy Scout Citation Medal (2009)
  - Recipient of the Commemorative Medal on the Occasion of the 60th Anniversary of the Accession to the Throne of H.M. King Bhumibol Adulyadej (2006)
- Tunisia: Grand Cross of the National Order of Merit
- Ukraine:
  - Member 1st Class of the Order of Merit
  - Member 1st Class of the Order of Prince Yaroslav the Wise
- United States: Ellis Island Medal of Honor

=== Awards ===
- Sweden: Grand Cross of the Social Order of the Amaranth
- Germany: The National German Sustainability Award
- United Arab Emirates: Recipient of the Shaikha Fatima Bint Mubarak Motherhood and Childhood Award (November 2016)

=== Honorary doctorates ===
Queen Silvia has been awarded a number of honorary doctorates, most recently for her work on dementia.

- 1990 – University of Turku
- 1993 – Karolinska Institute
- 1994 – Linköping University
- 1999 – University of Gothenburg
- 2023 – University of Stirling, UK

Silvia Sommerlath Born: 23 December 1943
Swedish royalty
Vacant Title last held by Louise Mountbatten	Queen consort of Sweden; 1976–present	Incumbent
