= Georg Kell =

- Born: Germany
- Education: Technische Universität Berlin
- Occupation: Chairman of Arabesque Partners

Georg Kell is the founder and former executive director of the United Nations Global Compact. He is also the Chairman of Anglo-German asset manager, Arabesque Partners.

In January 2015, it was announced that Kell would retire as executive director of the UN Global Compact after over 25 years of service to the United Nations. Lise Kingo was announced in June 2015 as his replacement.

In January 2016, Georg Kell was named as one of 2015's Most Influential People in Business Ethics by the Ethisphere Institute.

== Career ==
Georg Kell's early career began at the Fraunhofer Institute for Production Technology and Innovation in Berlin after completing his advanced degrees in Economics and Engineering at Technische Universität Berlin. Kell was a researcher whilst undergoing his postgraduate studies – he was a financial analyst specialising multinational portfolios in Asia and Africa.

=== United Nations ===
Kell started his United Nations career at the UN Conference on Trade and Development (UNCTAD) in Geneva in 1987.

In 1990, he joined UNCTAD's New York office, which he headed from 1993 to 1997.

In 1997, Kell became a senior officer in the executive office of the UN Secretary-General, responsible for fostering cooperation with the private sector.

=== United Nations Global Compact ===
The idea behind the UN Global Compact originated in a speech by then Secretary-General Kofi Annan to the World Economic Forum in the late 1990s. The speech was called ‘The Global Compact’ and it called on business, in an era of globalization, to take on more responsibility, not just to look for profit but also to build social, environmental and governance pillars. Popular reaction to the speech led to the official creation of the United Nations Global Compact in 2000, with Georg Kell as the founding executive director.

The Global Compact calls on companies to align strategies and operations with universal principles on human rights, labour, environment and anti-corruption, and take actions that advance societal goals. The ten principles are derived from the Universal Declaration of Human Rights, the Fundamental Principles and Rights at Work [International Labour Organization], the Rio Declaration on Environment and the UN Convention Against Corruption. Under the Global Compact, companies are brought together with UN agencies, labour groups and civil society. Cities can join the Global Compact through the Cities Programme.

In June 2015, United Nations Secretary-General Ban Ki-moon expressed his gratitude for Kell's services to the UN Global Compact and his commitment in fostering cooperation between the private sector and the United Nations. He cited Kell's exemplary leadership in the creation and management of the United Nations Global Compact since its creation.

=== Arabesque partners ===
In July 2017, Kell was announced as chairman of asset management firm Arabesque Partners, taking over from Robert Eccles.

In making the announcement Kell said: “After spending most of my professional career building an ESG [environmental, social, and governance] framework for companies, joining Arabesque seems the logical next step to help integrate this framework into portfolio management for the benefit of investors, corporations and all stakeholders alike.”

Arabesque integrates environmental, social and governance data with quantitative investment strategies. The firm was named as SRI Manager of the Year at The Investment Excellence Awards 2015 organized by Global Investor.

== Other activities ==
- Volkswagen, Member of the Sustainability Council
