= Anne-Birgitte Albrectsen =

Danish lawyer

Anne-Birgitte Albrectsen is a Danish lawyer and diplomat who, since 2022, is the Managing Director of ABA Global Action.

From 2015 to 2021 she was CEO of the humanitarian organization Plan International.

== Early life and education ==
Albrectsen holds a law degree from the University of Copenhagen.

== Career ==
Albrectsen worked with the United Nations Development Programme (UNDP) from 1997 to 2004, in Indonesia and later as Director of the Administrator’s Office at UNDP Headquarters. She led country operations for United Nations Population Fund (UNFPA) in Turkey, Armenia, Georgia and Azerbaijan from 2004 until 2006.

Albrectsen is the former UN Assistant Secretary General and Deputy Executive Director for Management at the United Nations Population Fund (UNFPA).

From 2007 and 2009, Albrectsen led the Danish government’s humanitarian and civil society affairs work as the director of the relevant division in the Danish Ministry of Foreign Affairs.

Albrectsen published several articles in the past, as for example for Impakter in 2017.

== Other activities ==
- Global Partnership for Sustainable Development Data, Member of the Board of Directors (since 2017)
