= Marta Santos Pais =

Portuguese lawyer (born 1952)

Special Representative of United Nations Secretary-General on Violence Against Children New York City
- In office 1 September 2009 – 30 May 2019
- Succeeded by: Najat Maalla M'jid

Personal details
- Born: 1952 (age 73–74) Lisbon, Portugal

Marta Santos Pais (born in 1952) a Portuguese lawyer who has served as Special Representative of the United Nations Secretary-General on Violence against Children from September 2009 until May 2019.

== Education ==
Santos Pais earned a law degree from the University of Lisbon.

== Career ==
Before her appointment Marta Santos Pais was the director of the UNICEF Innocenti Research Centre, a position she has held since 2001. She joined UNICEF in 1997 as director of evaluation, policy and planning. Previously she was the rapporteur of the Committee on the Rights of the Child and vice-chair of the Coordinating Committee on Childhood Policies of the Council of Europe. Santos Pais was a special adviser to the UN Study on Violence against Children and to the Machel Study on the Impact of Armed Conflict on Children.

Previously, Santos Pais was a member of the scientific committee of the International Child Centre in Paris, and visiting professor at the International University in Lisbon, Portugal. In Portugal, she was senior legal adviser for human rights in the Comparative Law Office and a member of the Portuguese Commission for the Promotion of Human Rights and Equality.

Santos Pais is the author of a large number of publications on human rights and children’s rights. She was a member of the UN Drafting Group of the 1989 Convention on the Rights of the Child and of its two Optional Protocols. She participated in the development of a number of other international human rights standards, including:

• The Statute of the International Criminal Court

• The Protocol to the International Covenant on Civil and Political Rights aiming at the abolition of the death penalty

• The Declaration on the Right and Responsibility of Individuals, Groups and Organs of Society to Promote and Protect Universally Recognized Human Rights and Fundamental Freedoms

• The Declaration on the Rights of Persons Belonging to National or Ethnic, Religious and Linguistic Minorities

• The Declaration on the Protection of All Persons from Enforced Disappearances.

== UN Special Representative on Violence against Children ==
=== SRSG mandate ===
The Special Representative of the Secretary-General on Violence against Children is an independent global advocate for the prevention and elimination of all forms of violence against children. Appointed by the Secretary-General of the United Nations in follow up to the UN Study on Violence against Children, she acts as a bridge builder and a catalyst of actions in all regions and in all settings where violence may occur. By mobilizing action and political support, she aims at maintaining momentum around this agenda and generates renewed concern at the harmful effects of violence on children; to promote behavioral and social change, and to achieve effective progress.
The mandate of the SRSG on Violence against Children is anchored in human rights standards, and promotes the universal ratification and effective implementation of core international conventions. The SRSG is particularly committed to pursuing three critical goals: the development in each country of a national strategy to prevent and respond to all forms of violence; the introduction of national legislation to prohibit all violence against children; and the consolidation of data and research to break the invisibility of violence and inform child sensitive policy and action.

=== SRSG Mandate Background ===
In 2001, United Nations General Assembly Resolution A/56/138 requested the Secretary General to conduct an in-depth study on the question of violence against children, following a recommendation of the Committee on the Rights of the Child.

The UN Secretary General’s Study on Violence against Children (A/61/299), led by Professor Paulo Sergio Pinheiro, addressed violence against children in five settings: the family, schools, alternative care institutions and detention facilities, places where children work and communities. The Study called for urgent action to prevent and respond to all forms of violence and presented a set of recommendations as guidance.

To promote dissemination of the Study and ensure effective follow up to its recommendations, the Study called for the appointment of a Special Representative of the Secretary General on Violence against Children (SRSG).

On 1 May 2009, the Secretary General announced the appointment of Marta Santos Pais (Portugal) as his Special Representative on Violence against Children. Marta Santos Pais took her position on September 1, 2009. She was followed by

The SRSG reports directly to the UN Secretary General, chairs the United Nations Inter Agency Working Group on Violence against Children and collaborates closely with a wide range of partners, within and beyond the UN system. The SRSG and her office are funded from voluntary contributions. The mandate was first established for a period of three years. In November 2012, the Third Committee of the United Nations General Assembly approved by consensus the omnibus resolution on the promotion and protection of the rights of children A/67/152. The resolution recommended that the Secretary-General extend the mandate of the Special Representative on Violence against Children for a further period of three years and decided that "for the effective performance of the mandate and the sustainability of the core activities the mandate of the SRSG shall be funded from the regular budget starting at the biennium 2014–2015".

The Office of the Special Representative is located in New York and provided with administrative support by the United Nations Children’s Fund (UNICEF). UNICEF has established a Trust Account in order to facilitate financial contributions in support of the mandate.

=== Violence against children ===
Violence cuts across all cultures and knows no social, economic or geographic borders compromising the life of millions of children around the world and is associated with profound social costs.

Available research leads to believe that between 500 million and 1.5 billion children worldwide endure some form of violence every year. Violence takes place in all contexts, including where children are expected to enjoy a secure environment and special protection – in care institutions, in the school and also within the home. Violence against children has dramatic and serious consequences, reducing human capacity and compromising social development.

And yet, it remains hidden and socially condoned. Widely perceived as a social taboo or a needed form of discipline, it is seldom reported; official statistics remain limited in their ability to capture the true scale and extent of this phenomenon; and, openly or implicitly, children feel pressed to conceal incidents of violence and abuse, particularly when perpetrated by people they know and trust. A culture of silence, secrecy and social indifference surrounds this phenomenon, paving the way to pervasive impunity. Violence hampers children’s development and leaves a long lasting impact. But, as confirmed by many successful initiatives promoted in all regions of the world, violence is not inevitable; it can be prevented and effectively addressed.

Around the globe, political commitments and law reform for children’s protection from violence is gaining momentum and becoming a priority in the national agenda of several States. Currently, 39 countries have introduced a comprehensive legal ban prohibiting violence in all settings, including corporal punishment in the home. In all regions, new legislative reform initiatives are currently under way to achieve full prohibition and in several countries new legislation is also under review to prohibit violence in specific settings. The legislative process has provided unique opportunities for sensitize the stakeholders and to involve community and religious leaders, parliamentarians, professional associations, academic institutions and grass-roots organizations, and engage communities concerned to promote change from within and consolidate prevention.

Across regions significant commitments have also been undertaken to place the protection of children high in the policy agenda. The formation of the South Asia Initiative to Eliminate Violence against Children (SAIEVAC) with its five-year strategic plan to address violence against children; the Pan American Congress on the Child, the strategy of the Council of Europe to prevent and eliminate violence; the adoption of the Marrakesh Declaration by the League of Arab States, in December 2010, and the Beijing Declaration by the High-Level Meeting on South-South Cooperation on Child Rights in Asia and the Pacific are key milestones in this process.

=== SRSG Field Missions ===
Since being appointed in September 2009, Santos Pais has completed 157 field missions in the following countries (63):

- Argentina
- Austria
- Belgium
- Belize
- Bolivia (Plurinational State of)
- Brazil
- Bulgaria
- Cambodia
- Chile
- China
- Costa Rica
- Croatia
- Denmark
- Dominican Republic
- Egypt
- El Salvador
- Ethiopia
- Fiji
- Finland
- France
- Germany
- Ghana
- Honduras
- India
- Indonesia
- Ireland
- Italy
- Jamaica
- Japan
- Lao People's Democratic Republic
- Lebanon
- Malawi
- Maldives
- Morocco
- Nepal
- The Netherlands
- Nicaragua
- Nigeria
- Norway
- Panama
- Paraguay
- Peru
- Philippines
- Poland
- Portugal
- Qatar
- Russia
- Slovenia
- Solomon Islands
- Spain
- Sri-Lanka
- Sweden
- Switzerland
- Tanzania
- Thailand
- Turkey
- United Kingdom of Great Britain and Northern Ireland
- United Republic of Tanzania
- Ukraine
- Uruguay
- United States of America
- Viet Nam

== Other activities ==
- Global Partnership to End Violence Against Children, Member of the Board (since 2016)
- International Journal of Children’s Rights, Member of the Editorial Advisory Board
- International Inter-disciplinary Course on Children’s Rights, Member of the Advisory Board

== Personal life ==
Marta Santos Pais is married and mother of two children. She is a national of Portugal.
