= Arabesque Partners =

- Industry: Investment Management
- Founded: 2013
- Headquarters: London; Frankfurt; Singapore
- Key people: Georg Kell, Chairman Barbara Krumsiek (board); Yolanda Kakabadse (board); Carolyn Woo (board); Kate James (board) Carlo Koelzer (board)
- Website: arabesque.com

Arabesque Partners (or Arabesque Asset Management) is an Anglo-German investment management firm founded in 2013, with headquarters in London and a research hub in Frankfurt.

== History ==
The company was established as a partnership in 2013 through a management buyout of all rights and intellectual property.

=== Organisation ===
Arabesque was founded by Omar Selim, who is the Chief Executive Officer based in London. He was formerly Head of Global Markets for institutional clients in Europe, the Middle East, Africa and Eastern Europe at Barclays Bank PLC. Arabesque Asset Management is a registered member of the UN Global Compact, the UK Sustainable Investment and Finance Association (UKSIF) and the European Investment Forum (EUROSIF). In May 2017, Arabesque Asset Management announced Anja Mikus as CIO to lead the German government’s nuclear phase-out fund.

=== Research ===
In September 2014, Arabesque partnered with the Smith School of Enterprise and the Environment at the University of Oxford to release a report entitled ‘From the Stockholder to the Stakeholder’. The enhanced meta-study cites over 190 sources and identifies a correlation between high Environmental, Social, Governance (ESG) quality and financial performance. In January 2015, a case study on the CEO of Arabesque, Omar Selim, was published by George Serafeim and Rebecca Henderson at Harvard Business School, and was taught to MBA students at Harvard Business School.

== Investors ==
=== Arabesque Group ===
In January 2022, ABG Real Estate invested in Arabesque Group. ABG Real Estate was supported in this transaction by PwC.

=== Arabesque AI ===
In January 2020, DWS invested in Arabesque AI. In February 2023, Carolina Minio Paluello was appointed as CEO of Arabesque AI.

== Media ==
In September 2021, Arabesque launched the world's first AI ESG fund manager. In March 2021, Arabesque has hired Herman Brill as CEO for its asset management unit and Ulrika Hasselgreen as Head of Nordics and Head of Europe for Corporates and Sovereigns.
