= List of spouses of presidents and chancellors of Germany =

This is a list of spouses of the president of Germany and the chancellor of Germany.

== Spouses of the heads of state since 1919 ==
=== German Reich (1919–1945) ===
| Image | Name | Relation to president |
|---|---|---|
| | Louise Ebert | wife of President Friedrich Ebert |
| | Eva Hitler | wife of Führer and Reichskanzler Adolf Hitler (one day, prior to their suicide) |
| | Ingeborg Dönitz | wife of President Karl Dönitz |

=== German Democratic Republic (East Germany, 1949–1990) ===
| Image | Name | Relation to head of state |
|---|---|---|
| | Lotte Ulbricht | wife of Chairman of the State Council Walter Ulbricht |
| | Marianne Stoph (née Wiegank); Alice Stoph (née Lütgens) | wife of Chairman of the State Council Willy Stoph |
| | Margot Honecker | wife of Chairman of the State Council Erich Honecker |
| | Erika Krenz | wife of Chairman of the State Council Egon Krenz |
| | Brigitte Gerlach | wife of Chairman of the State Council Manfred Gerlach |
| | Jürgen Bergmann | husband of acting head of state Sabine Bergmann-Pohl |

=== Federal Republic of Germany (1949–present) ===
| Image | Name | Relation to president |
|---|---|---|
| | Elly Heuss | wife of President Theodor Heuss |
| | Wilhelmine Lübke | wife of President Heinrich Lübke |
| | Hilda Heinemann | wife of President Gustav Heinemann |
| | Mildred Scheel | wife of President Walter Scheel |
| | Veronica Carstens | wife of President Karl Carstens |
| | Marianne von Weizsäcker | wife of President Richard von Weizsäcker |
| | Christiane Herzog | wife of President Roman Herzog |
| | Christina Rau | wife of President Johannes Rau |
| | Eva Köhler | wife of President Horst Köhler |
| | Bettina Wulff | wife of President Christian Wulff |
| | Daniela Schadt | domestic partner of President Joachim Gauck |
| | Elke Büdenbender | wife of President Frank-Walter Steinmeier |

== Spouses of the heads of government ==
=== German Reich (1871–1945) ===
| Image | Name | Relation to chancellor |
German Empire (1871–1918)
| | Princess Johanna von Bismarck | Wife of Prince Otto von Bismarck |
| | – | Count Leo von Caprivi unmarried during office |
| | Princess Marie zu Hohenlohe-Schillingsfürst | Wife of Prince Chlodwig zu Hohenlohe-Schillingsfürst |
| | Princess Maria von Bülow | Wife of Prince Bernhard von Bülow |
| | Martha von Bethmann Hollweg | Wife of Theobald von Bethmann Hollweg |
| | Margarete Michaelis | Wife of Georg Michaelis |
| | Countess Anna von Hertling | Wife of Count Georg von Hertling |
| | Princess Marie Louise of Hanover | Wife of Prince Maximilian of Baden |
Weimar Republic (1918–1933)
| | Louise Ebert | Wife of Friedrich Ebert |
| | Johanna Scheidemann | wife of Philipp Scheidemann |
| | Hedwig Bauer | wife of Gustav Bauer |
| | Gottliebe Müller | wife of Hermann Müller (1st term) |
| | Marie Fehrenbach | wife of Constantin Fehrenbach |
| | – | Joseph Wirth unmarried during office |
| | Martha née Wirtz | wife of Wilhelm Cuno |
| | Käte Stresemann | wife of Gustav Stresemann |
| | Johanna Marx | wife of Wilhelm Marx (1st term) |
| | – | Hans Luther unmarried during office |
| | Johanna Marx | wife of Wilhelm Marx (2nd term) |
| | Gottliebe Müller | wife of Hermann Müller (2nd term) |
| | – | Heinrich Brüning unmarried during office |
| | Martha von Boch-Galhau | wife of Franz von Papen |
| | Elisabeth von Schleicher | wife of Kurt von Schleicher |
Nazi Germany (1933–1945)
| | Eva Hitler | wife of Adolf Hitler (one day, prior to their suicide) |
| | Magda Goebbels | wife of Joseph Goebbels |
| | Ehrengard Freiin von Plettenberg | wife of Lutz Graf Schwerin von Krosigk |

=== German Democratic Republic (East Germany, 1949–1990) ===
| Image | Name | Relation to Head of Government |
|---|---|---|
| | Marie Martha Louise Grotewohl (née Ohst); Johanna Groteohl (formerly Schumann, née Danielzig) | wife of Minister-President Otto Grotewohl |
| | Marianne Stoph (née Wiegank); Alice Stoph (née Lütgens) | wife of Chairman of the Council of Ministers Willi Stoph |
| | Inge Sindermann (née Locke) | wife of Chairman of the Council of Ministers Horst Sindermann |
| | Marianne Stoph (née Wiegank); Alice Stoph (née Lütgens) | wife of Chairman of the Council of Ministers Willi Stoph |
| | Annemarie Modrow (née Straubing) | wife of Chairman of the Council of Ministers Hans Modrow |
| | Ilse de Maizière (née N.N.); Marianne Strodt | wife of Minister-President Lothar de Maizière |

=== Federal Republic of Germany (1949–present) ===
| Image | Name | Relation to chancellor |
|---|---|---|
| | Auguste Adenauer († 1948) | Konrad Adenauer widowed during office |
| | Luise Erhard | wife of Ludwig Erhard |
| | Marie-Luise Kiesinger | wife of Kurt Georg Kiesinger |
| | Rut Brandt | wife of Willy Brandt |
| | Hannelore Schmidt | wife of Helmut Schmidt |
| | Hannelore Kohl | wife of Helmut Kohl |
| | Doris Schröder-Köpf | wife of Gerhard Schröder |
| | Joachim Sauer | husband of Angela Merkel |
| | Britta Ernst | wife of Olaf Scholz |
| | Charlotte Merz | wife of Friedrich Merz |
