= Stiftung Ordnungspolitik =

Stiftung Ordnungspolitik (German: [ˈʃtɪftʊŋ ˈʔɔʁdnʊŋspoliˌtiːk]) is a nonprofit organization dealing with the ordoliberal tradition of the Freiburg school of economics. It strives to maintain and further develop ordo-economics based on the ideas of Walter Eucken and Friedrich August von Hayek.

The foundation drafts practical policy options on the basis of the continued academic development of ordo-economics and promotes public awareness for the meaning of ordoliberal thinking. To this end, it regularly invites politicians, scientists and economists such as, for instance, Angela Merkel, Axel A. Weber, Kurt Beck, Karl-Theodor zu Guttenberg or Cem Özdemir.

The foundation was established in December 1998 on the occasion of the 50th anniversary of Walter Eucken's death.

The "Centres for European Policy Network" (cep) is the foundation's think tank on the policy of the European Union. The Centre fulfils the foundation's tasks for all issues of European decision-making: It analyses major EU policy projects in terms of ordoliberal criteria in order to inform and consult politics, media and the public.

Chairman of the executive boards of "Stiftung Ordnungspolitik" and "Centres for European Policy Network" (Centre for European Policy) is Prof. Dr. Henning Vöpel. Chairman of the board of trustees of "Stiftung Ordnungspolitik" is Dr. Habil. Lüder Gerken was the chairman of the board from 1999 to 2021. Members of the board of trustees are Roman Herzog, Hans Tietmeyer, Leszek Balcerowicz and Frits Bolkestein.
