= Centre for European Policy =

Germany-based think tank

Coordinates: 47°59′32″N 7°50′55″E

Centre for European Policy Network
- Centrum für Europäische Politik
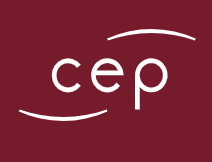
- Abbreviation: cep
- Formation: 2006
- Founder: Stiftung Ordnungspolitik
- Type: Think tank
- Purpose: EU legislation analysis, ordoliberal policy, free market economy
- Headquarters: Freiburg, Germany
- CEO: Henning Vöpel
- Parent organization: Stiftung Ordnungspolitik
- Website: cep.eu

The Centre for European Policy Network (German: cep | Centrum für Europäische Politik) is a European policy think tank funded by the non-profit Stiftung Ordnungspolitik (Foundation for Regulatory Policy). The organization is based in Freiburg, Germany, and operates offices in Germany, France, and Italy.

It analyses EU legislation and develops policy recommendations for public and private stakeholders. The academic foundation of its studies and analyses is based on the principles of regulatory policy within a liberal, market-based economic order.

Cep focuses on a range of policy areas, including economic policy, environmental policy, financial market regulation, the digital economy, institutional affairs, and eurozone governance.

The organisation has participated in meetings with the European Commission and has contributed to public consultations and policy roadmaps, including those related to data protection and the European internal security strategy.

== Organisation ==
The chief executive officer is economist Henning Vöpel, former director of the Hamburg Institute of International Economics (HWWI) and professor at BSP Business and Law School.

Members of the Board of Trustees have included Roman Herzog, Leszek Balcerowicz, Jürgen Stark, Udo Di Fabio, Günther Oettinger, and Holger Steltzner.

Lüder Gerken serves as chairman of the foundation board and has also held roles within the Stiftung Ordnungspolitik and the Friedrich August von Hayek Foundation.

== Aims and activities ==
The organisation conducts research on European policy across several areas, including financial markets, digitalisation, energy and climate policy, transport, competition, and economic and fiscal policy.

According to its publications, the think tank seeks to contribute to public understanding of European Union policymaking and to evaluate legislative initiatives. It produces analyses of EU proposals and offers policy recommendations to decision-makers.

The organisation states that its work is based on ordoliberal principles, which emphasise a regulatory framework established by the state to ensure competition while limiting direct intervention in market processes.

== Stiftung Ordnungspolitik ==
The Stiftung Ordnungspolitik, which funds the think tank, promotes the ordoliberal tradition associated with the Freiburg School of Economics. This tradition is linked to economists such as Walter Eucken and was further developed by Friedrich August von Hayek, influencing post-war German economic policy.

The foundation organises public events, including lectures and panel discussions, featuring political and academic participants.

== Scholarly debate of the 2019 study ==
In 2019, the organisation published a study concluding that Germany had benefited more than other countries from the introduction of the common currency, based on comparisons with selected non-euro economies.

The findings were disputed by some economists, who argued that the methodology overlooked factors such as national reforms and monetary policy differences, with Clemens Fuest noting that developments in countries like Germany and Italy could not be attributed solely to the euro, while other researchers also questioned the robustness of the "synthetic control method," citing methodological limitations and alternative estimates suggesting smaller or negative effects for Germany.
