= Veronica Carstens =

German First Lady (1923–2012)

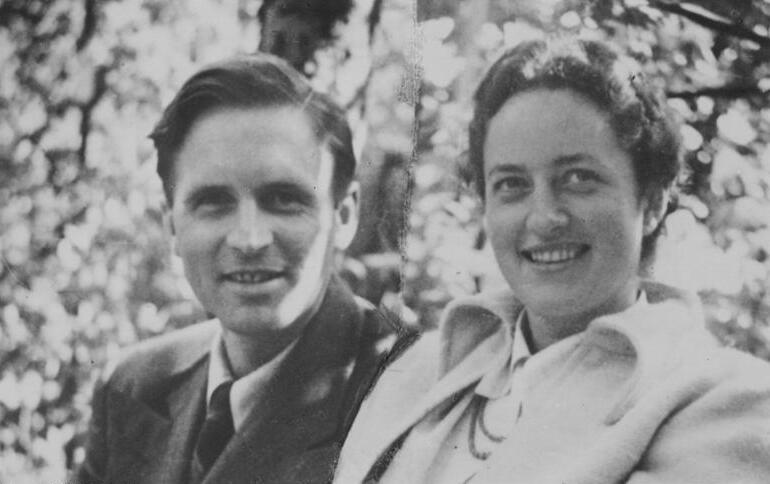
- Veronica with Karl Carstens, 1949

First Lady of Germany
- In role 1 July 1979 – 30 June 1984
- President: Karl Carstens
- Preceded by: Mildred Scheel
- Succeeded by: Marianne von Weizsäcker

Personal details
- Born: Veronica Prior; 18 June 1923 Bielefeld, Weimar Republic
- Died: 25 January 2012 (aged 88) Bonn, Germany
- Spouse: Karl Carstens (1944–1992, his death)

Veronica Carstens (born Prior; 18 June 1923 – 25 January 2012) was the wife of the German President Karl Carstens.

She began medical studies in 1941, which she interrupted during the war to work as a nurse. In 1944 she married at Tegel Karl Carstens, whom she had met the year before. Temporarily she was a housewife. In 1956 she continued her medical studies, graduating in 1960.

From 1960 to 1968 she worked as a medical assistant and in 1968 she opened her medical practice in Meckenheim near Bonn.

Carstens was by profession a doctor of medicine, and she maintained her practice throughout her husband's tenure as president. She was a strong advocate of naturopathy and homeopathy, and in 1982 the Carstens established the Carstens-Foundation (Carstens-Stiftung) – a major funder of alternative medicine research in Europe. She was an honorary member of the Order of Saint John (Bailiwick of Brandenburg).

She was widowed in 1992. After she had retired from public life in 2009, she lived in a sanitarium in Bonn.

Honorary titles
Preceded by Mildred Scheel	First Lady of Germany; 1979-1984	Succeeded by Marianne von Weizsäcker
