= Salaam-Schalom Initiative =

Salaam-Schalom is an intercultural activist initiative, which was established in December 2013 by Berliner Jews and Muslims. It stands for a peaceful co-existence and solidarity, and promotes these aims by implementing various interventions and projects which raise awareness to social and institutional exclusions in mainstream German society.

== Activities ==
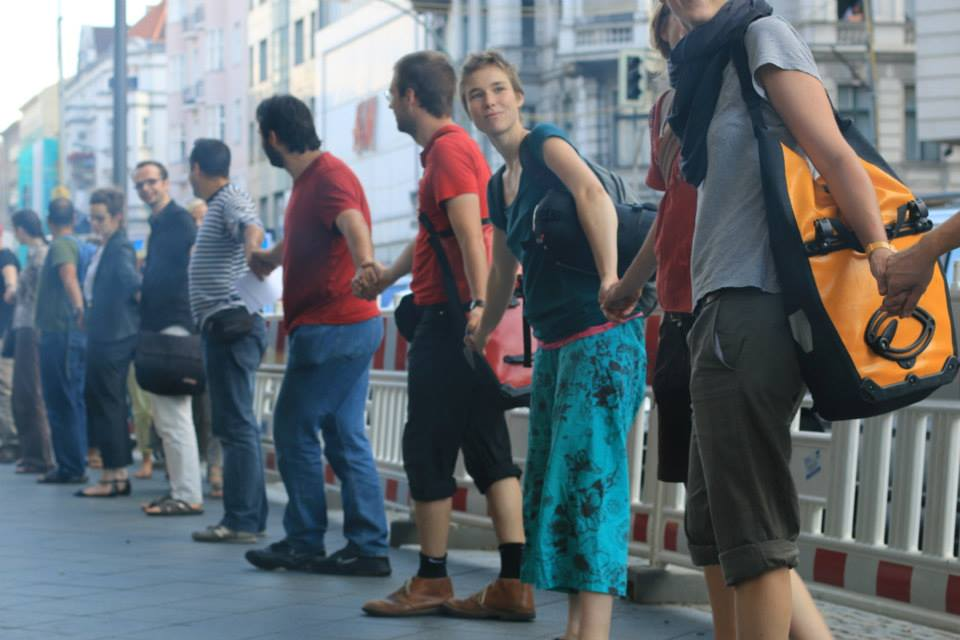
Human chain against antisemitism and Islamophpobia 2014. Foto (c) Ömer Sefa Baysal

The initiative organizes regularly open discussion rounds, panel discussions, and workshops. Activists of the group formed in Summer 2014, during the Gaza conflict, a human chain against antisemitism and Islamophobia, and to demonstrate the importance of unity. In July 2015, the group organized a solidarity demonstration with women who cover their hair. The group demanded equal opportunities for women with headcoverings.

== Reception ==
The Salaam-Schalom Initiative has received extensive media coverage in Germany, and in August 2014, members of the group were invited to a meeting with German President Joachim Gauck. In October 2014, the First Lady of Germany, Daniela Schadt visited the group in the neighborhood of Neukölln in Berlin. In April 2015, the group was awarded with the Ribbon for Courage and Reconciliation by Berlin Governing Mayor Michael Müller.
