= Christiane Herzog =

Wife of President of Germany

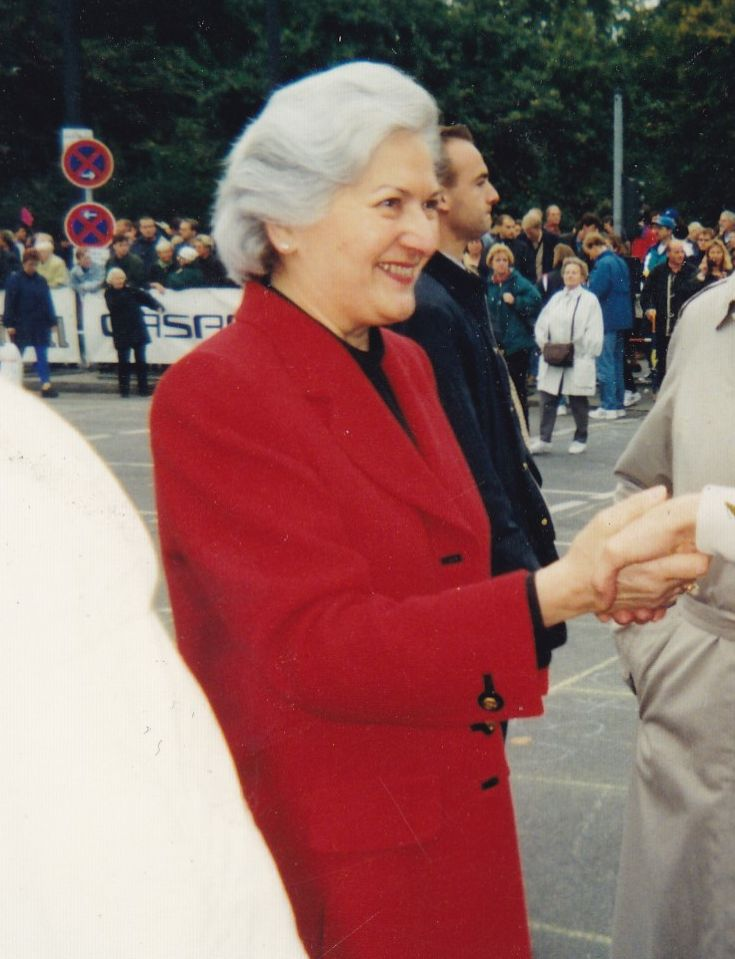
- Herzog at the 1996 Berlin Marathon

Spouse of the President of Germany
- In role 1 July 1994 – 30 June 1999
- President: Roman Herzog
- Preceded by: Marianne von Weizsäcker
- Succeeded by: Christina Rau

Personal details
- Born: Christiane Krauss; 26 October 1936 Munich, Bavaria, Nazi Germany
- Died: 19 June 2000 (aged 63) Munich, Germany
- Spouse: Roman Herzog
- Children: 2

Christiane Herzog (née Krauss) (26 October 1936, Munich – 19 June 2000, Munich) was the wife of Roman Herzog, the former president of Germany.

== Biography ==
She was the daughter of a Protestant parish priest, Paul Krauss and his wife Friedl. As a child Christiane was probably destined for leadership joining the Pathfinder movement. She was educated at the same school as her future husband, Landshut Grammar, in The Allgau, Bavaria, and studied at the Ludwig-Maximilians-Universität München to graduate in Pedagogy, in 1955. She married in 1958, still aged only twenty-one, Roman Herzog, a childhood sweetheart. Christiane and her husband were members of the Evangelical Church in Germany. They had two sons (born 1959 and 1964). Before he was elected President, Roman had a long and distinguished career as a legal scholar and professor at various universities, and since as a Member of Parliament, as a cabinet minister in the state of Baden-Württemberg, as a judge and finally President of the Federal Constitutional Court of Germany from 1987 to 1994. The family lived in a number of cities, moving in 1969 to Ziegelhausen, near Heidelberg. From 1973 the family resided in the West German capital Bonn. Before moving to Stuttgart in 1978 and then finally to Karlsruhe.

From 1985 to 1993, she was the Christliches Jugenddorfwerk Deutschlands Vice President. During her husband's tenure as President, she was the patron of the German UNICEF committee and the Müttergenesungswerk, and took on several charitable responsibilities, such as visiting orphanages in South America. On her husband's election as President of Germany she is said to have remarked "I do not consider myself a carnation in the button-hole."

During the 1990s, Christiane appeared in several films. Beckmann (1999) in which she was uncredited for one episode, was a successful series that reached international audiences. On the television show Zu Gast bei Christiane Herzog (1996), where she invited a guest (usually some prominent person) to the Bellevue Palace and discussed contemporary issues in the kitchen of the presidential residence while they were cooking. This theme gained critical acclaim when published into English as An Invitation to Dine. and Kochern mit Kindern.

Christiane was a guest on the talk show Alfredissimo - kochen mit bio in 1995 and children's game show Wetten, dass...? the following year. Her beef roulade, goose breast, and spaetzle were well-known among the German public. Her no-nonsense demeanor was frequently mimicked by comedians, and she was popular with famous figures such as Michael Schumacher, Otto Koch, and Thomas Gottschalk.

By the time Ramon Herzog took over as president, she had driven thousands of kilometers around Germany in her second hand car canvassing the support of at least half a million Germans every year. Christiane's cookbooks offered an insight into her husband's diet, giving her cookery a nationwide appeal. For the last three years of her life, she suffered from an incurable cancer, ultimately leading to her death. The Christiane Herzog Foundation for the Cystic Fibrosis Sick was named in her honor, which went on to become a leading research institute for the disease.

Unofficial roles
Preceded by Marianne von Weizsäcker	Spouse of the President of Germany; 1994–1999	Succeeded by Christina Rau
