= Order of the Cross of Terra Mariana =

Estonian state decoration

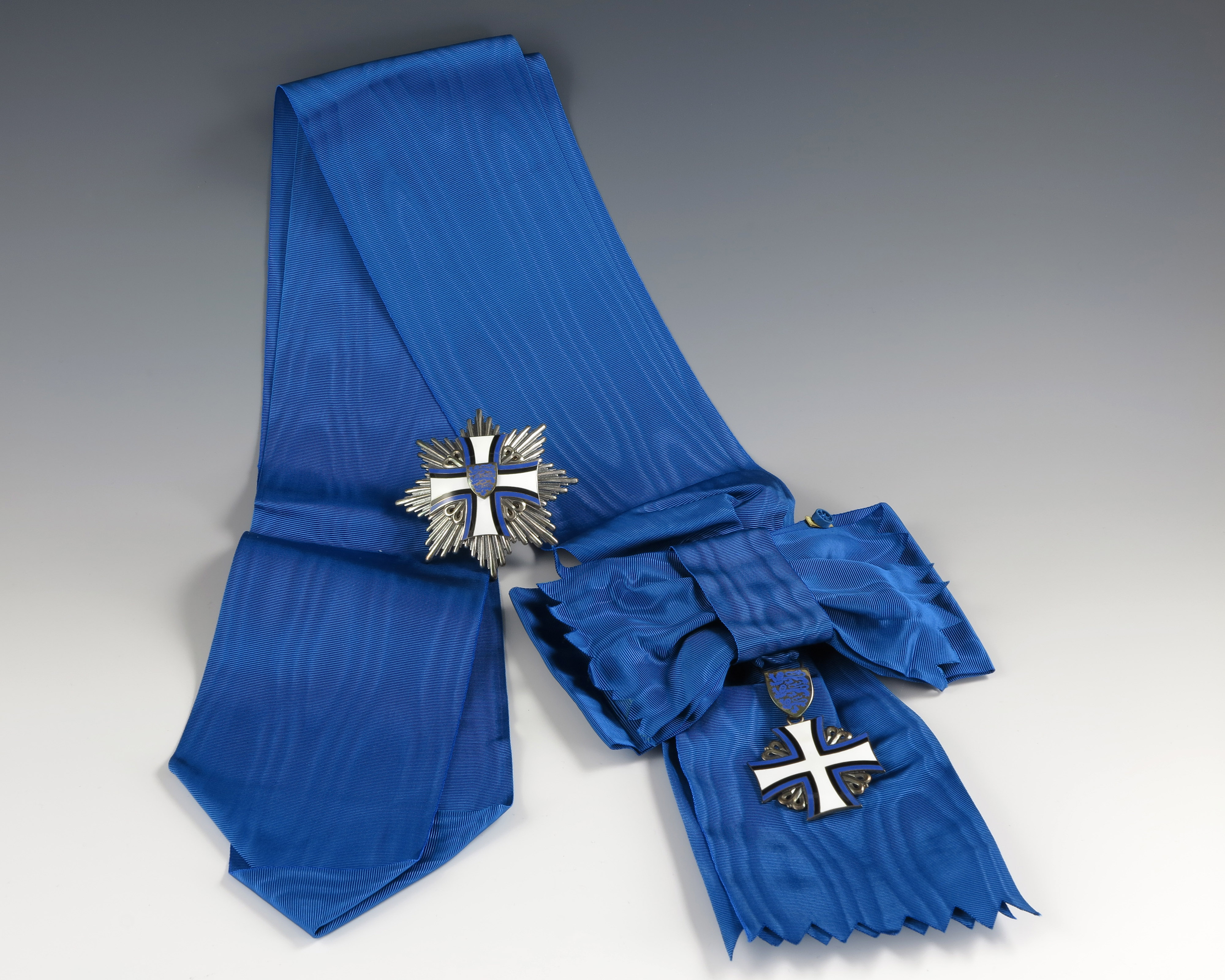
- The sash and the breast star of the order
- Type: Six-class order
- Awarded for: To honour the independence of the Estonian state. The President of the Republic bestows the Order of the Cross of Terra Mariana to foreigners who have rendered special services to the Republic of Estonia.
- Country: Estonia
- Presented by: President of Estonia
- Established: 16 May 1995
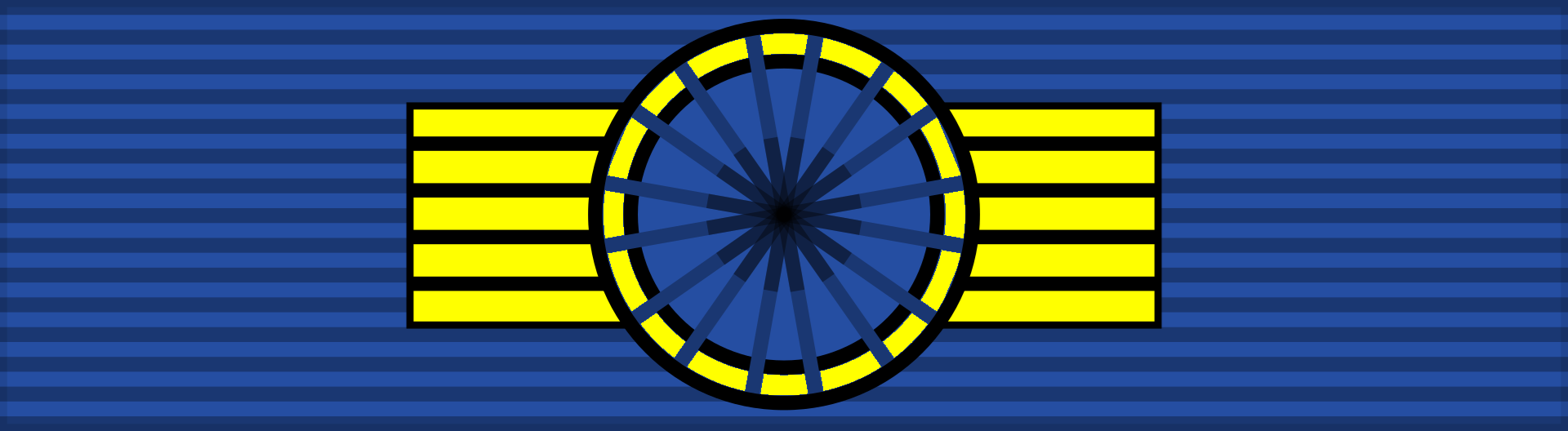
- Collar 1st Class 2nd Class 3rd Class 4th Class 5th Class Ribbon bars of the Order of the Cross of Terra Mariana

Precedence
- Next (higher): Order of the National Coat of Arms
- Next (lower): Order of the White Star

The Order of the Cross of Terra Mariana (Estonian: Maarjamaa Risti teenetemärk, also the Order of the Cross of St. Mary's Land) was instituted by the President of Estonia, Lennart Meri, on 16 May 1995 to honour the independence of the Estonian state. The first nomination into the order was made on the same day, and it went to the President of Finland, Martti Ahtisaari.

The Latin name Terra Mariana, meaning the "Land of Mary", was the official name for Medieval Livonia and designated the area which includes what is now Latvia and southern Estonia in medieval times.

The Order of the Cross of Terra Mariana is bestowed upon the President of the Republic. Presidents of the Republic who have ceased to hold office keep the Order of the Cross of Terra Mariana. The Collar of the Order was used de facto as the badge of office of the President of the Republic, since Soviet authorities took the original presidential collar, that of the Order of the National Coat of Arms, out of Estonia after the Soviet occupation of Estonia in 1940; it remains as of 2023 in the Kremlin in Moscow. A new collar of that order was made in 2008.

The Order of the Cross of Terra Mariana is also given as a decoration of the highest class to foreigners who have rendered special services to the Republic of Estonia. As such it is the highest and most distinguished order granted by Estonia to non-Estonian citizens.

== Classes ==
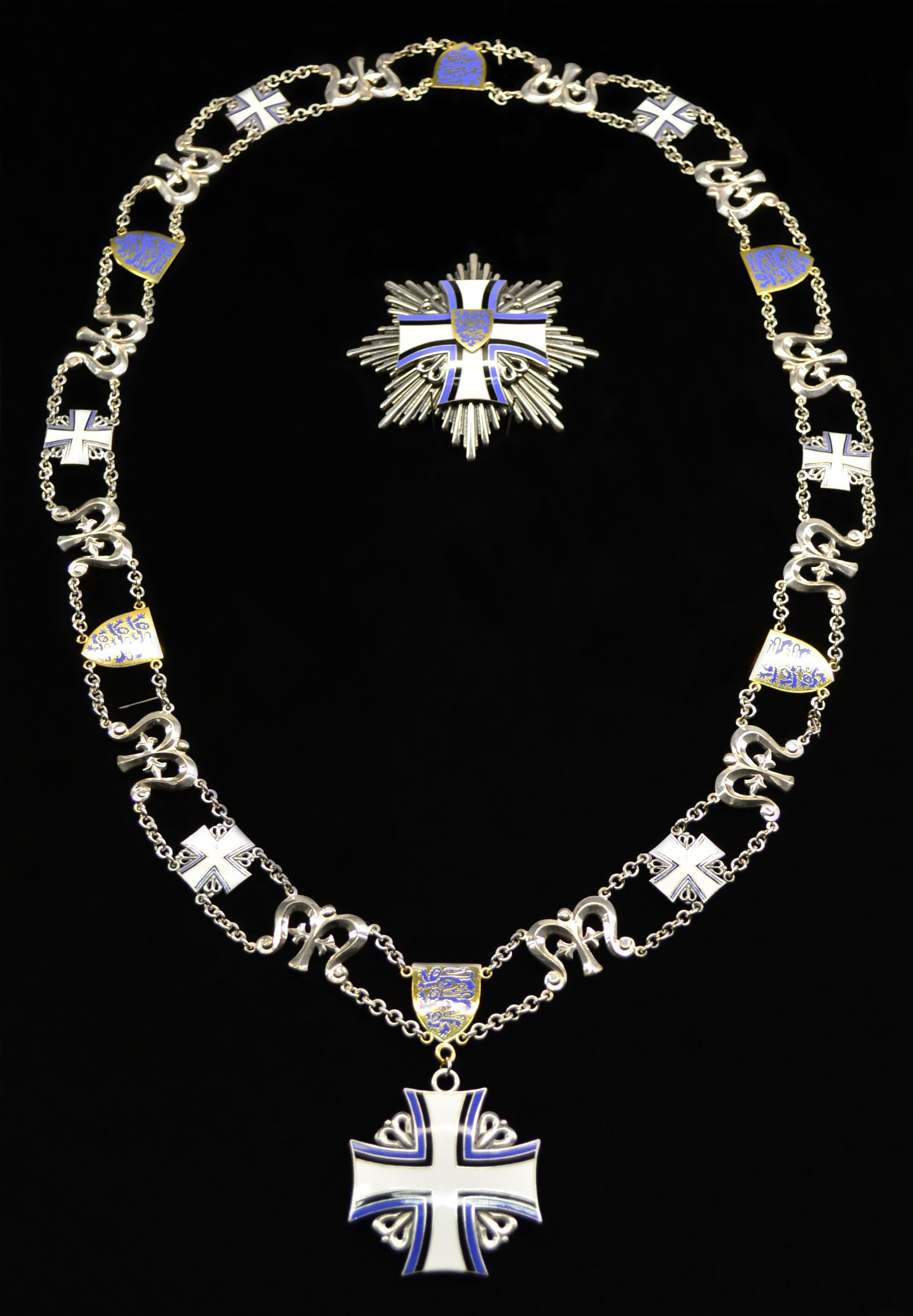
Collar of the order

The Order of the Cross of Terra Mariana comprises six classes:

- One special class – The Collar of the Cross of Terra Mariana;
- Five basic classes – 1st, 2nd, 3rd, 4th and 5th class.

The crosses and shields of all the classes of the Order of the Cross of Terra Mariana have the same design and are of the same size.

The blue colour tone of the moiré ribands belonging to the decorations of all the classes of the Order of the Cross of Terra Mariana is determined according to the international PANTONE colour-table as 300 C.

== Notable recipients ==
=== Recipients of the Collar ===
The recipients are:

==== (Estonia) Estonian presidents ====
- President Lennart Meri (1992–2001), 10.09.1995 (Serie 5 – n° ?)
- President Arnold Rüütel (2001–2006), 08.10.2001 (Serie 270 – n° 1138)
- President Toomas Hendrik Ilves (2006–2016), 09.10.2006 (Serie 692 – n° 1071)
- President Kersti Kaljulaid (2016-2021), 10.10.2016
- President Alar Karis (2021–)

==== Foreign heads of state ====
Country	Recipient	Date of reception	Serie number	Decision : number & date
Awarded by President Lennart Meri ( 6 October 1992 – 8 October 2001 )
Finland	Pres. Martti Ahtisaari	16.05.1995	1	547
Sweden	King Carl XVI Gustaf	11.09.1995	11	608
Mexico	Pres. Ernesto Zedillo Ponce de León	27.10.1995	22	624
Denmark	Queen Margrethe II	28.11.1995	23	640
Czech Republic	Pres. Václav Havel	24.02.1997	37	725 (30.05.1996)
Latvia	Pres. Guntis Ulmanis	23.10.1996	39	6
Hungary	Pres. Árpád Göncz	13.05.1997	49	134
Slovenia	Pres. Milan Kučan	16.05.1997	50	134
Italy	Pres. Oscar Luigi Scalfaro	22.05.1997	51	144
Turkey	Pres. Süleyman Demirel	20.05.1997	52	144
Lithuania	Pres. Algirdas Brazauskas	20.08.1997	55	177
Poland	Pres. Aleksander Kwaśniewski	28.04.1998	72	320
Iceland	Pres. Ólafur Ragnar Grímsson	08.06.1998	73	351
Norway	King Harald V	31.08.1998	75	397
Greece	Pres. Konstantinos Stephanopoulos	24.05.1999	99	586
Lithuania	Pres. Valdas Adamkus	24.09.1999	102	632
Latvia	Pres. Vaira Vīķe-Freiberga	02.05.2000	121	780
Finland	Pres. Tarja Halonen	16.05.2000	123	788
Germany	Pres. Johannes Rau	07.11.2000	131	914
Hungary	President Ferenc Mádl	12.12.2000	177	944
Malta	President Guido de Marco	02.05.2001	233	1049
Ireland	President Mary McAleese	24.05.2001	241	1057
France	President Jacques Chirac	23.07.2001	243	1124
Awarded by President Arnold Rüütel ( 8 October 2001 – 9 October 2006 )
Turkey	President Ahmet Necdet Sezer	18.04.2002	377	141
Luxembourg	Henri, Grand Duke of Luxembourg	05.05.2003	416	332
Portugal	President Jorge Sampaio	12.05.2003	417	408 (08.05.2003)
Bulgaria	President Georgi Parvanov	11.06.2003	435	414
Romania	President Ion Iliescu	23.10.2003	446	451
Cyprus	President Tassos Papadopoulos	08.01.2004	449	451
Italy	President Carlo Azeglio Ciampi	20.04.2004	498	581
Slovakia	President Ivan Gašparovič	12.10.2005	599	896
Hungary	President László Sólyom	27.03.2006	688	994
Awarded by President Toomas Hendrik Ilves (9 October 2006 – 10 October 2016)
United Kingdom	Queen Elizabeth II	19.10.2006	693	2
Georgia	President Mikheil Saakashvili	07.05.2007	739	148
Japan	Emperor Akihito	24.05.2007	740	150
Spain	King Juan Carlos I	09.07.2007	741	168
Portugal	President Aníbal Cavaco Silva	24.09.2008	783	269
Netherlands	Queen (now Princess) Beatrix	14.05.2008	824	280
Belgium	King Albert II	10.06.2008	837	290
Latvia	President Valdis Zatlers	07.04.2009	872	460
Romania	President Traian Băsescu	12.04.2011	968	881
Kazakhstan	President Nursultan Nazarbayev	20.04.2011	970	885
Malta	President George Abela	31.05.2012	988	98
Latvia	President Andris Bērziņš	05.06.2012	1001	99
Lithuania	President Dalia Grybauskaitė	27.05.2013	1045	266
Germany	President Joachim Gauck	03.07.2013	1087	305
Finland	President Sauli Niinistö	09.05.2014	1150	429
Slovakia	President Andrej Kiska	19.10.2015	1233	682
Awarded by President Kersti Kaljulaid ( 10 October 2016 – 11 October 2021)
Netherlands	King Willem-Alexander	12.06.2018	1283	265
Italy	President Sergio Mattarella	04.07.2018	1298	294
Latvia	President Raimonds Vējonis	10.04.2019	1324	440
Portugal	President Marcelo Rebelo de Sousa	15.04.2019	1339	442
Slovenia	President Borut Pahor	02.09.2019	1344	473
Austria	President Alexander Van der Bellen	21.05.2021	1368	744
Romania	President Klaus Iohannis	15.06.2021	1370	755
Awarded by President Alar Karis (11 October 2021 -)
Latvia	President Egils Levits	19.04.2023	1400	300
Finland	President Alexander Stubb	23.05.2024	1444	412
Poland	President Andrzej Duda	08.04.2025	1461	536 (07.04.2025)
Denmark	King Frederik X	22.01.2026	1476	655
Lithuania	President Gitanas Nausėda	07.04.2026	1497	682
Czech Republic	President Petr Pavel	20.05.2026	1513	716
Latvia	President Edgars Rinkēvičs	19.06.2026	1514	742

=== Recipients of the First Class ===
The recipients are :

==== Sitting and former foreign heads of state and government ====
These decorations are awarded for targeted reasons :

Country	Recipient	Date of reception	Serie number	Decision: number & date
Awarded by President Lennart Meri (6 October 1992 – 8 October 2001)
United States	Former President Gerald Ford	07.01.1997	29	683 (16.02.1996)
Sweden	Former Prime Minister Carl Bildt	25.07.1996	36	725 (30.05.1996)
Germany	Former President Roman Herzog	20.03.2001	104	730 (08.02.2000)
Awarded by President Arnold Rüütel (8 October 2001 – 9 October 2006)
Finland	Former President Mauno Koivisto	20.11.2001	271	30 (16.11.2001)
Finland	Prime Minister Paavo Lipponen	20.11.2001	274	30 (16.11.2001)
Poland	Prime Minister Leszek Miller	18.03.2002	338	121 (13.03.2002)
Norway	Prime Minister Kjell Magne Bondevik	10.04.2002	358	137 (02.04.2002)
Finland	Former Prime Minister Esko Aho, for supporting quest of independence	23.02.2003	381	332 (03.02.2003)
Ireland	Former Prime Minister Garret FitzGerald	22.05.2003	383	332 (03.02.2003)
Denmark	Former Prime Minister Poul Schlüter, for supporting quest of independence	24.02.2003	387	332 (03.02.2003)
United States	Former President George H. W. Bush, for supporting quest of independence	15.09.2005	524	775 (02.02.2005)
Germany	Former President Richard von Weizsäcker, for supporting quest of independence	09.06.2005	529	775 (02.02.2005)
Latvia	Prime Minister Aigars Kalvītis	07.12.2005	613	937 (05.12.2005)
United States	Former President Bill Clinton, for support of Estonia's accession to NATO	?	634	976 (06.02.2006)
Germany	Former Chancellor Helmut Kohl, for supporting quest of independence	03.04.2006	635	976 (06.02.2006)
Poland	Former President Lech Wałęsa, for supporting quest of independence	23.02.2006	636	976 (06.02.2006)
Awarded by President Toomas Hendrik Ilves (9 October 2006 – 10 October 2016)
Finland	Prime Minister Matti Vanhanen	14.03.2007	726	137 (12.03.2007)
Spain	Prime Minister José Luis Rodríguez Zapatero	09.07.2007	745	168 (05.07.2007)
Portugal	Former Prime Minister José Manuel Barroso	23.02.2009	855	423 (04.02.2009)
Denmark	Prime Minister Anders Fogh Rasmussen, for support of Estonia's accession to the European Union and NATO	24.03.2009	856	423 (04.02.2009)
Sweden	Former Prime Minister Ingvar Carlsson	?	908	807 (12.01.2011)
Sweden	Former Prime Minister Göran Persson	25.02.2011	913	807 (12.01.2011)
Sweden	Prime Minister Fredrik Reinfeldt	18.01.2011	914	807 (12.01.2011)
United States	Former President George W. Bush	?	973	48 (01.02.2012)
Poland	Former Prime Minister Jerzy Buzek	18.03.2014	1121	391 (14.03.2014)
Poland	Prime Minister Donald Tusk	18.03.2014	1115	391 (14.03.2014)
Awarded by President Kersti Kaljulaid (10 October 2016 – 11 October 2021)
Luxembourg	Prime Minister Xavier Bettel, for promoting relations between Estonia and Luxembourg	16.04.2018	1280	221 (05.02.2018)
Norway	Former Prime Minister Jens Stoltenberg	09.10.2020	1314	384 (29.01.2019)
Germany	Chancellor Angela Merkel, for promoting relations between Estonia and Germany	?	1355	702 (23.02.2021)
Awarded by President Alar Karis (11 October 2021 –)
Latvia	Prime Minister Krišjānis Kariņš	24.04.2023	1403	300 (19.04.2023)
Iceland	Former President Guðni Jóhannesson	?	1457	522 (05.02.2025)

==== Consorts of foreign heads of state and royalties ====
Country	Recipient	Date of reception	Serie number	Decision : number & date
Awarded by President Lennart Meri ( 6 October 1992 – 8 October 2001 )
Finland	Eeva Ahtisaari, née Hyvärinen, President Martti Ahtisaari's wife	16.05.1995	2	547 ( 16.05.1995 )
Sweden	Queen Silvia of Sweden	11.09.1995	12	608 ( 08.09.1995 )
Sweden	Victoria, Crown Princess of Sweden	11.09.1995	13	608 ( 08.09.1995 )
Sweden	Prince Bertil, Duke of Halland	11.09.1995	14	608 ( 08.09.1995 )
Sweden	Princess Lilian, Duchess of Halland	11.09.1995	15	608 ( 08.09.1995 )
Denmark	Henrik, Prince Consort of Denmark	28.11.1995	25	640 ( 20.11.1995 )
Denmark	Frederick, Crown Prince of Denmark	28.11.1995	24	640 ( 20.11.1995 )
Norway	Queen Sonja of Norway	31.08.1998	76	397 ( 24.08.1998 )
Latvia	Imants Freibergs, President Vaira Vīķe-Freiberga's husband	02.05.2000	122	780 ( 27.04.2000 )
Finland	Pentti Arajärvi, President Tarja Halonen's husband	16.05.2000	124	788 ( 04.05.2000 )
Germany	Christina Rau, President Johannes Rau's wife	07.11.2000	132	914 ( 02.11.2000 )
Hungary	Dalma Mádl, President Ferenc Mádl's wife	12.12.2000	178	944 ( 01.12.2000 )
Malta	Violet de Marco, President Guido de Marco's wife	02.05.2001	234	1049 ( 24.04.2001 )
Ireland	Martin McAleese, President Mary McAleese's husband	24.05.2001	242	1057 ( 15.05.2001 )
Awarded by President Arnold Rüütel (8 October 2001 – 9 October 2006)
Finland	Taimi Tellervo Koivisto, President Mauno Henrik Koivisto's wife	20.11.2001	272	30 ( 16.11.2001 )
Poland	Jolanta Kwaśniewska, President Aleksander Kwaśniewski's wife :	18.03.2002	337	121 ( 13.03.2002 )
Norway	Haakon, Crown Prince of Norway	10.04.2002	356	137 ( 02.04.2002 )
Norway	Mette-Marit, Crown Princess of Norway	10.04.2002	357	137 ( 02.04.2002 )
Portugal	Maria José Ritta, First Lady and President Jorge Sampaio's wife :	12.05.2003	418	408 ( 08.05.2003 )
Bulgaria	Zorka Petrova Parvanova, President Georgi Parvanov's wife :	11.06.2003	436	414 ( 30.05.2003 )
Awarded by President Toomas Hendrik Ilves (9 October 2006 – 10 October 2016)
Spain	Sofia of Spain	09.07.2007	742	168 ( 05.07.2007 )
Spain	Felipe, Prince of Asturias	09.07.2007	743	168 ( 05.07.2007 )
Spain	Letizia, Princess of Asturias	09.07.2007	744	168 ( 05.07.2007 )
Belgium	Queen Paola of Belgium	10.06.2008	838	290 ( 05.06.2008 )
Latvia	Lilita Zatlere, President Valdis Zatlers's wife :	07.04.2009	873	460 ( 02.04.2009 )
Sweden	Prince Daniel, Duke of Västergötland	18.01.2011	906	807 ( 12.01.2011 )
Sweden	Prince Carl Philip, Duke of Värmland	18.01.2011	907	807 ( 12.01.2011 )
Romania	Maria Băsescu, President Traian Băsescu's wife	12.04.2011	969	881 ( 06.04.2011 )
Malta	Margaret Abela, President George Abela's wife	31.05.2012	989	98 ( 29.05.2012 )
Latvia	Dace Seisuma, President Andris Bērziņš's wife	05.06.2012	1002	99 ( 31.05.2012 )
Germany	Daniela Schadt, President Joachim Gauck's partner	09.07.2013	1088	305 ( 03.07.2013 )
Awarded by President Kersti Kaljulaid ( 10 October 2016 – 11 October 2021 )

==== High Personalities ====
Country	Recipient	Date of reception	Serie number	Decision : number & date
Awarded by President Lennart Meri ( 6 October 1992 – 8 October 2001 )
European Union	Otto von Habsburg, Member of European Parliament	11.10.1996	30	683 ( 16.02.1996 )
European Union	Mr Jacques Delors, former chairman of the European Commission	23.03.1999	78	495 ( 02.02.1999 )
Turkey	Bartholomew I Archbishop and Patriarch of Constantinople-New Rome	27.10.2000	130	444 ( 09.10.2000 )
Awarded by President Arnold Rüütel (8 October 2001 – 9 October 2006)
Russia	Alexy II of Moscow, Patriarch of Moscow and All Russia	29.09.2003	439	444 ( 18.09.2003 )
Spain	Juan Antonio Samaranch	29.11.2003	448	464 ( 20.11.2003 )
European Union	John Kjær, Head of the Delegation of the European Union (2000–04)	23.11.2004	523	717 ( 12.11.2004 )
European Union	Patrick Cox, Former President of European Parliament, for supporting adhesion to European Union	03.11.2006	526	775 ( 02.02.2005 )
European Union	Christopher Patten, Former Member of the European Commission, for supporting adhesion to European Union	27.10.2005	527	775 ( 02.02.2005 )
European Union	Günter Verheugen, Former Member of the European Commission, for supporting adhesion to European Union	02.05.2005	528	775 ( 02.02.2005 )
Awarded by President Toomas Hendrik Ilves ( 9 October 2006 – 10 October 2016 )
European Union	José Manuel Durão Barroso, President of the European Commission	23.02.2009	855	423 ( 04.02.2009 )
NATO	Jakob Gijsbert de Hoop Scheffer	09.07.2009	886	520 ( 06.07.2009 )
European Union	Hans-Gert Pöttering (Germany), President of the European Parliament	23.02.2013	1036	224 ( 06.02.2013 )
United States	Vinton Gray Cerf, Computer scientist	28.04.2014	1103	368 ( 05.02.2014 )
Awarded by President Kersti Kaljulaid ( 10 October 2016 – 11 October 2021)

=== Recipients of the Fourth Class ===
- Robert Fripp, 2008

=== Recipients of the Fifth Class ===
- Lydia Vasikova, 2001

== See also ==
- Category:Recipients of the Order of the Cross of Terra Mariana
