= Hildegard Hamm-Brücher =

German politician

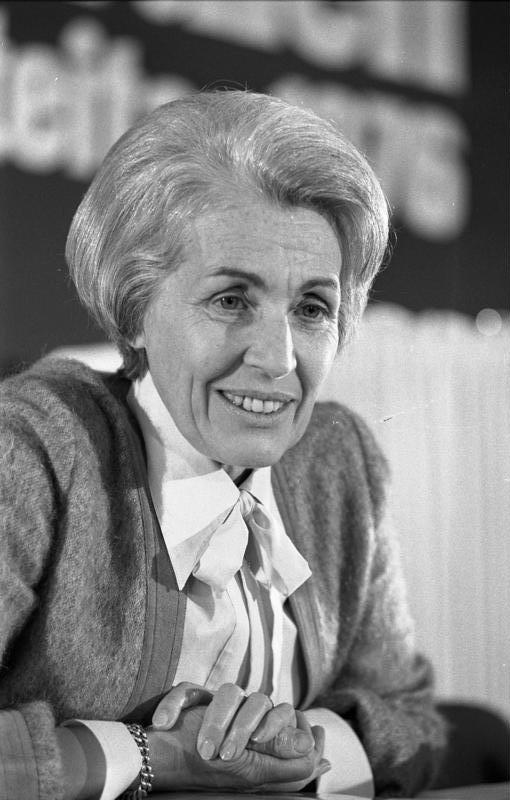
Hildegard Hamm-Brücher in 1976

Hildegard Hamm-Brücher (11 May 1921 – 7 December 2016) was a liberal politician in Germany. She held federal state secretary positions from 1969 to 1972 and from 1977 to 1982. She was the Free Democratic Party's candidate in the first two rounds of the federal presidency elections in 1994.

== Early life and education ==
Hamm-Brücher was born in Essen, Germany and grew up with four siblings in a non-political, bourgeois family. Her father was director of an electric firm; her mother maintained the household. Unexpectedly, her parents died within a year of each other when she was only ten and eleven years old. After the death of her parents, along with her siblings, she was brought up by her widowed grandmother in Dresden. Her grandmother came from an industrial family, whose ancestors had converted from Judaism to Protestantism. Hamm-Brücher received her Abitur in 1939 and studied chemistry in Munich. She received her doctorate in chemistry in 1945 and began working as a science journalist for the Neue Zeitung, an American-run newspaper, in what was then still occupied Germany.

== Political career ==
Hamm-Brücher joined the Free Democratic Party in 1948. She was elected to the Munich city council from 1948 to 1954, the Landtag of Bavaria from 1950 to 1966 and again from 1970 to 1976, and the Bundestag from 1976 to 1990. Hamm-Brücher focussed much of her work on education policy, and was appointed as secretary of state to the Hessian and federal Ministry for Education in 1967 and 1969, respectively. She also served as a Minister of State in the German Foreign Office from 1977 to 1982, while her party was part of a coalition government with the Social Democratic Party.

In 1982, the Free Democratic Party left that coalition in order to form a new coalition with the Christian Democratic Union. Rather than holding new elections, the Free Democrats supported a constructive vote of no confidence against Chancellor Helmut Schmidt and in favor of Christian Democrat Helmut Kohl. Hamm-Brücher prominently opposed the new coalition itself, as well as the method of switching coalitions without an election. Subsequently she lost her position as Minister of State, but continued to serve as a member of the parliament until 1990.

Her party nominated her as the Free Democrats' candidate in the German presidential election in 1994. However, the Free Democratic Party, then still in a coalition with the much larger Christian Democratic Union under Chancellor Kohl, ultimately chose to support the Christian Democrat's candidate Roman Herzog in the election's third round. Herzog went on to win the election with the combined majority of Christian and Free Democrats.

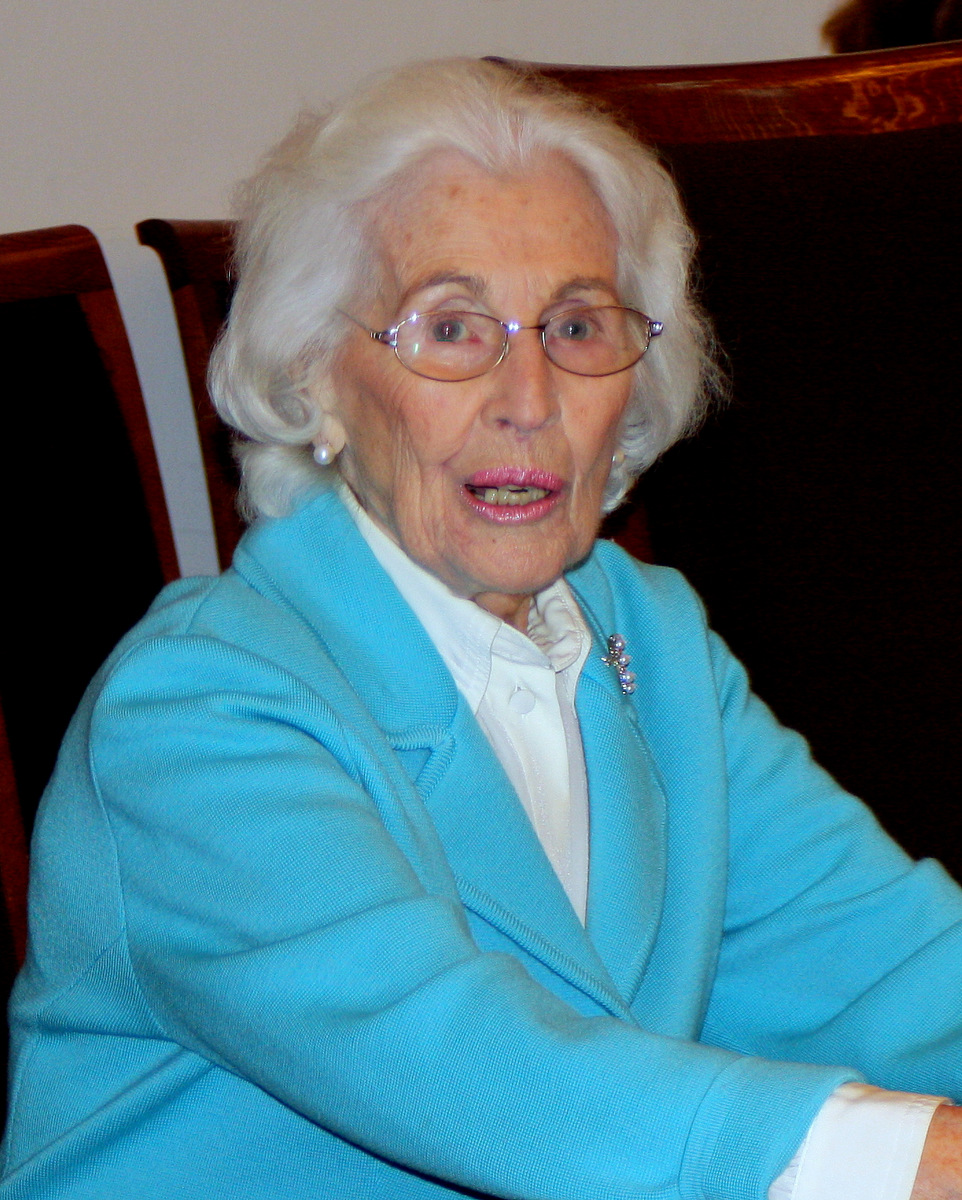
Hildegard Hamm-Brücher in 2010

In 2002, Hamm-Brücher left the Free Democratic Party after a controversy with Jürgen Möllemann about his election campaign that harshly criticized Ariel Sharon, then Prime Minister of Israel. She served as a Green Party delegate to the Federal Convention for the purpose of electing the President of Germany in 2012.

Hamm-Brücher died on 7 December 2016 at the age of 95.

== Other activities ==
Hamm-Brücher authored several books and articles, often focussing on the state of modern democracy and the relationship between politics and ethical questions. She was a member of the Goethe Institute's biannual General Meeting.

== Recognition ==
- 1992 – Buber Rosenzweig Medal (together with Annemarie Renger)
