= Lüder Gerken =

German economist

Lüder Gerken (born 30 July 1958 in Bremen) is a German economist.

On finishing secondary school, Gerken trained first as a banker. Then, from 1981 to 1991, he went on to study Economics, completing his degree in 1985 and his PhD in 1988, followed by law, from which he graduated in 1991. From 1991 to 2001 Gerken headed the Freiburg-based Walter Eucken Institut. He completed his habilitation in 1998 at the University of Bayreuth, where he received a teaching post for Economics. From 2001 to 2004, Gerken was chairman of the Stiftung Marktwirtschaft in Berlin. From 1999 to 2021, he was chairman of the executive board of Stiftung Ordnungspolitik and the Friedrich-August-von-Hayek-Stiftung; from 2006 to 2021 he has been director of the Centrum für Europäische Politik, a think tank that analyzes EU-policies. Gerken has been a member of the board of trustees for the Initiative Neue Soziale Marktwirtschaft.

In his work, his main focus is on national and international ordoliberal policy, European integration and location competition. Gerken has been criticized by Klaus Hänsch, MEP, for his "heavy" Euroskepticism.
