= 1994 German presidential election =

- 23 May 1994
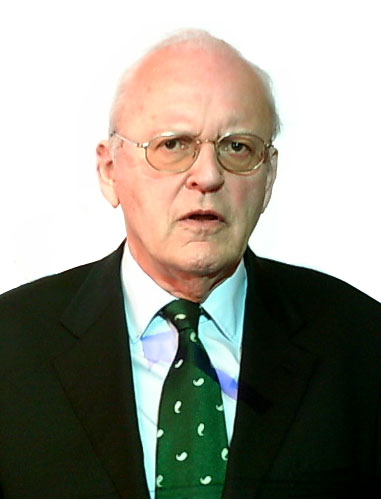

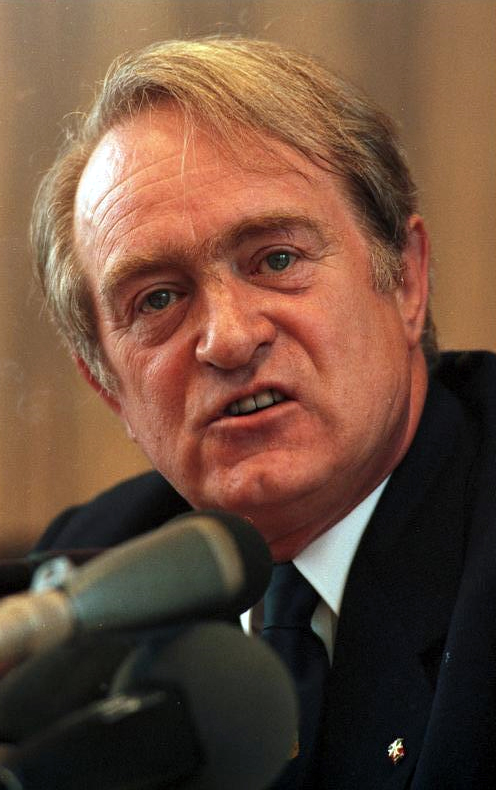
Nominee	Roman Herzog	Johannes Rau
Party	CDU	SPD
Electoral vote	604 (1st round); 622 (2nd round); 696 (3rd round)	505 (1st round); 559 (2nd round); 605 (3rd round)
Percentage	52.6%	45.7%
Nominators	CDU/CSU, FDP	SPD
President before election
Richard von Weizsäcker
CDU
Elected President
Roman Herzog
CDU

An indirect presidential election (officially the 10th Federal Convention) was held in Germany on 23 May 1994 and the first after the reunification. Incumbent president Richard von Weizsäcker was term-limited and could therefore not stand for reelection. Roman Herzog, candidate for the Christian Democratic Union, was elected in three rounds of voting.

== Composition of the Federal Convention ==
The president is elected by the Federal Convention consisting of all the members of the Bundestag and an equal number of delegates representing the states. These are divided proportionally by population to each state, and each state's delegation is divided among the political parties represented in its parliament so as to reflect the partisan proportions in the parliament.

By party		By state	
Party	Members	State	Members
CDU/CSU	620	Bundestag	662
SPD	502	Baden-Württemberg	79
FDP	112	Bavaria	96
Greens	43	Berlin	28
PDS	34	Brandenburg	22
Republicans	8	Bremen	5
Independents	4	Hamburg	13
DVLH	1	Hessen	46
Total	1324	Mecklenburg-Vorpommern	16
		North Rhine-Westphalia	141
		Rhineland-Palatinate	32
		Saarland	9
		Saxony	41
		Saxony-Anhalt	25
		Schleswig-Holstein	23
		Thuringia	23
		Total	1324

== Results ==
Berlin, 23 May 1994 – Total votes 1324 – Absolute majority 663
Candidate	First Round		Second Round		Third Round		Nominating Party		
Candidate	Votes	%	Votes	%	Votes	%	First Round	Second Round	Third Round
Roman Herzog	604	45.6%	622	47.0%	696	52.6%	CDU/CSU	CDU/CSU, FDP	
Johannes Rau	505	38.1%	559	42.2%	605	45.7%	SPD		
Hildegard Hamm-Brücher	132	10.0%	126	9.5%			FDP		
Jens Reich	62	4.7%					Alliance '90/The Greens		
Hans Hirzel	12	0.9%	11	0.8%	11	0.8%	The Republicans		
Valid votes	1,315	100%	1,318	100%	1,312	100%			
