= Eva Köhler =

Wife of former German president Horst Köhler

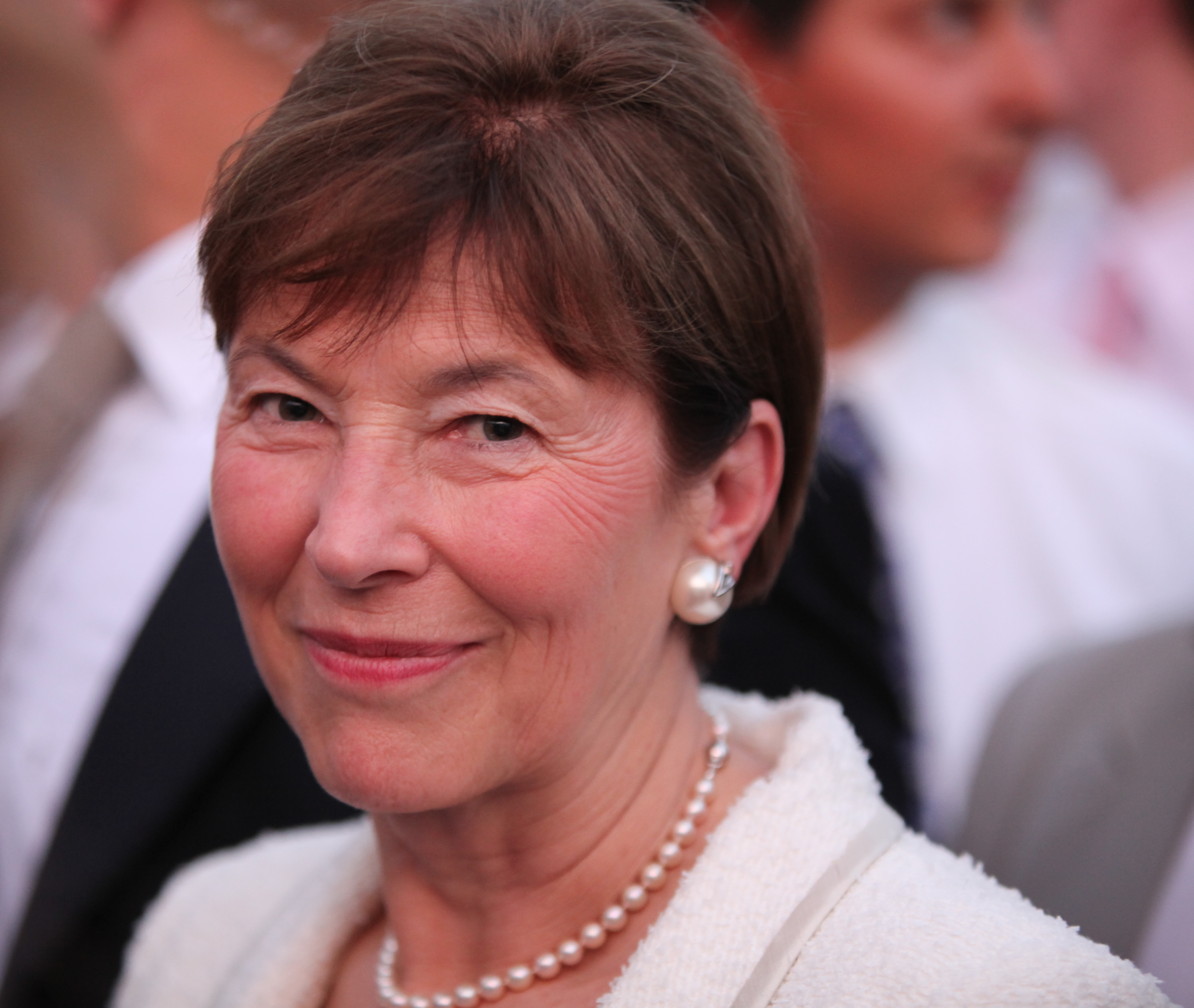

Spouse of the President of Germany
- In role 1 July 2004 – 31 May 2010
- President: Horst Köhler
- Preceded by: Christina Rau
- Succeeded by: Bettina Wulff

Personal details
- Born: Eva Luise Bohnet; 2 January 1947 (age 79) Ludwigsburg, Germany
- Party: Social Democratic Party (1972–1990); Christian Democratic Union
- Spouse: Horst Köhler (m. 1969; died 2025)
- Children: 2
- Occupation: Teacher

Eva Luise Köhler (German: [ˈkøːlɐ]; née Bohnet; born 2 January 1947) is the widow of former German president Horst Köhler and as such, was sometimes referred to by the media as the "First Lady" during her husband's presidency.

== Education and career ==
She completed her Abitur in Ludwigsburg in 1966, and studied history, Germanistics and religion. She then became a teacher of German. Eva Köhler was a member of the Social Democratic Party (SPD) from 1972 to 1990 as she advocated Willy Brandt's Ostpolitik and participated in local politics. She left the SPD because she disliked the politics of Oskar Lafontaine.

== Personal life ==
Eva and Horst Köhler have two children, Ulrike (born 1972) and Jochen (born 1977). Her husband died on 1 February 2025.

== Honours ==
=== Foreign honours ===
- Italy: Knight Grand Cross of the Order of Merit of the Italian Republic (21 March 2006)
- Lithuania : Grand Cross of the Order of Vytautas the Great (19 October 2005)
- Portugal: Grand Cross of the Order of Prince Henry (2 March 2009)
- Netherlands : Grand Cross of the Order of the Crown (2007)

Unofficial roles
Preceded by Christina Rau	Spouse of the President of Germany; 2004–2010	Succeeded by Bettina Wulff
