= Christina Rau =

Spouse of German former president Johannes Rau

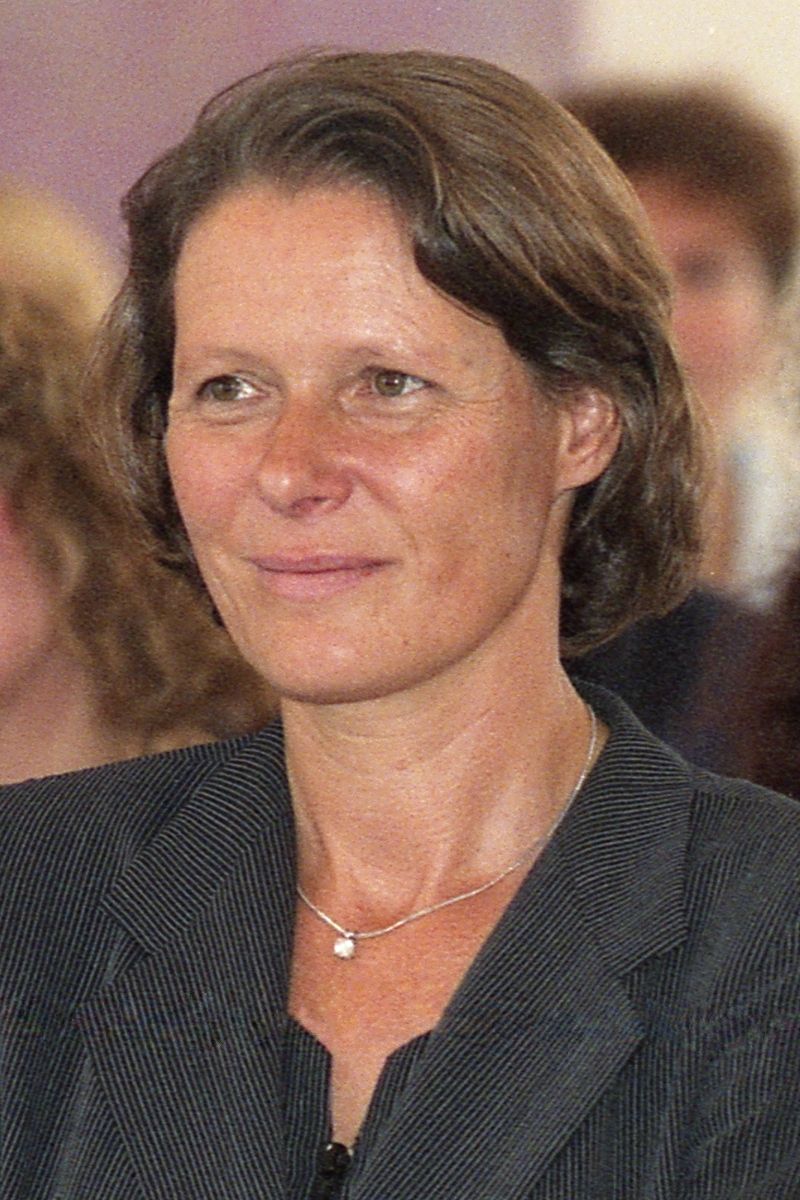
- Christina Rau in 2002

Spouse of the President of Germany
- In role 1 July 1999 – 30 June 2004
- President: Johannes Rau
- Preceded by: Christiane Herzog
- Succeeded by: Eva Köhler

Personal details
- Born: Christina Delius; 30 October 1956 (age 70) Bielefeld, West Germany
- Party: Social Democratic Party of Germany
- Spouse: Johannes Rau (m. 1982; died 2006)
- Relations: Uta Ranke-Heinemann (aunt)
- Children: 3
- Education: University College of Wales; King's College London

Christina Rau (née Delius; 30 October 1956) is the widow of Johannes Rau, President of Germany from 1999–2004.

== Early life ==
Rau is the maternal granddaughter of former President Gustav Heinemann. Her father was Eduard Delius (1922–2013), part of a long line of entrepreneurs in the textile industry of the Westphalian city of Bielefeld; her mother was Christa Heinemann (1928–2016), a daughter of the former President. Through her mother, Rau is the niece of theologian Uta Ranke-Heinemann. She attended boarding school in Switzerland (Hochalpines Institut Ftan) and the United Kingdom (Gordonstoun in Scotland, where Prince Andrew was a contemporary). Subsequently, she studied political science, economics and history at the University College of Wales and at King's College London.

== Wedding ==
On 9 August 1982, she married Johannes Rau, 25 years her senior and a long-time friend of the Heinemann family, who was at that time the Prime Minister of the German state of North Rhine-Westphalia.

== Activities ==
She was the patron of :

- UNICEF Germany,
- the Müttergenesungswerk,
- the Bundesverband der Organtransplantierten,
- the Deutsche Kinder- und Jugendstiftung
- the Red Cross Youth of Germany.

== Honours ==
=== Foreign Honours ===
- Austria: Grand Cross of the Order of Honour for Services to the Republic of Austria
- Estonia: First Class of the Order of the Cross of Terra Mariana
- Iceland: Grand Cross of the Order of the Falcon
- Latvia: Commander Grand Cross of the Order of the Three Stars
- Spain: Dame Grand Cross of the Order of Isabella the Catholic
- Sweden: Member Grand Cross of the Order of the Polar Star
