= Friedrich-August-von-Hayek-Stiftung =

Foundation in Germany

Coordinates: 47.9922°N 7.8485°E

The Friedrich-August-von-Hayek-Stiftung was founded in May 1999 to mark the 100th birthday of Friedrich August von Hayek, winner of the Nobel Memorial Prize in Economic Sciences. The foundation has its seat in Freiburg im Breisgau (South Germany) and is run by Dr. habil Lüder Gerken. Sponsors are Wüstenrot & Württembergische AG. Its aim is, in its own words, to strengthen and promote the basic principles of a liberal economic and social order at both national and international level, as expounded by Friedrich August von Hayek.

== Hayek Prize ==
The Friedrich-August-von-Hayek-Stiftung grants the International Prize and the Journalism Prize every two years. These prizes are awarded to personalities who have distinguished themselves through exemplary and extraordinary achievements in the establishment, development or promotion of a liberal economic and social order in Germany, in Europe, or in other parts of the world.

== Board of trustees ==
Members of the board of trustees are Roman Herzog (since 1999), Leszek Balcerowicz (since 2002), Frederik Bolkestein (since 1999), Ralf Dahrendorf (1999–2009), Alexander Erdland (since 2006), Lüder Gerken (since 1999), Laurence Hayek (1999–2004), Otmar Issing (since 2005), Jürgen Jeske (since 1999) and Hans Tietmeyer (since 1999).
