= Louise Ebert =

German First Lady (1873–1955)

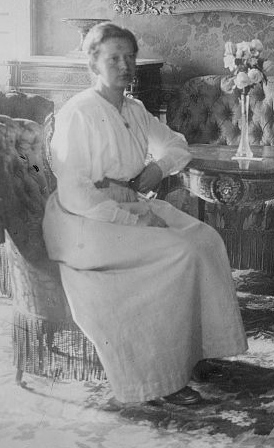

Spouse of the President of Germany
- In role 11 February 1919 – 28 February 1925
- President: Friedrich Ebert
- Preceded by: Position established
- Succeeded by: Eva Braun (1945)

Personal details
- Born: Louise Dorothea Amalie Rump; 23 December 1873 Weyhe, German Empire
- Died: 18 January 1955 (aged 81) Heidelberg, West Germany

Louise Ebert (née: Rump 23 December 1873 – 18 January 1955) on 9 May 1894 in Bremen married Friedrich Ebert, who from his election in 1919 until his death on 28 February 1925 served as the first Reichspräsident of the Weimar Republic.

The couple had four sons and one daughter. The eldest son, named Friedrich like his father, served as mayor of East Berlin between 1948 and 1967.

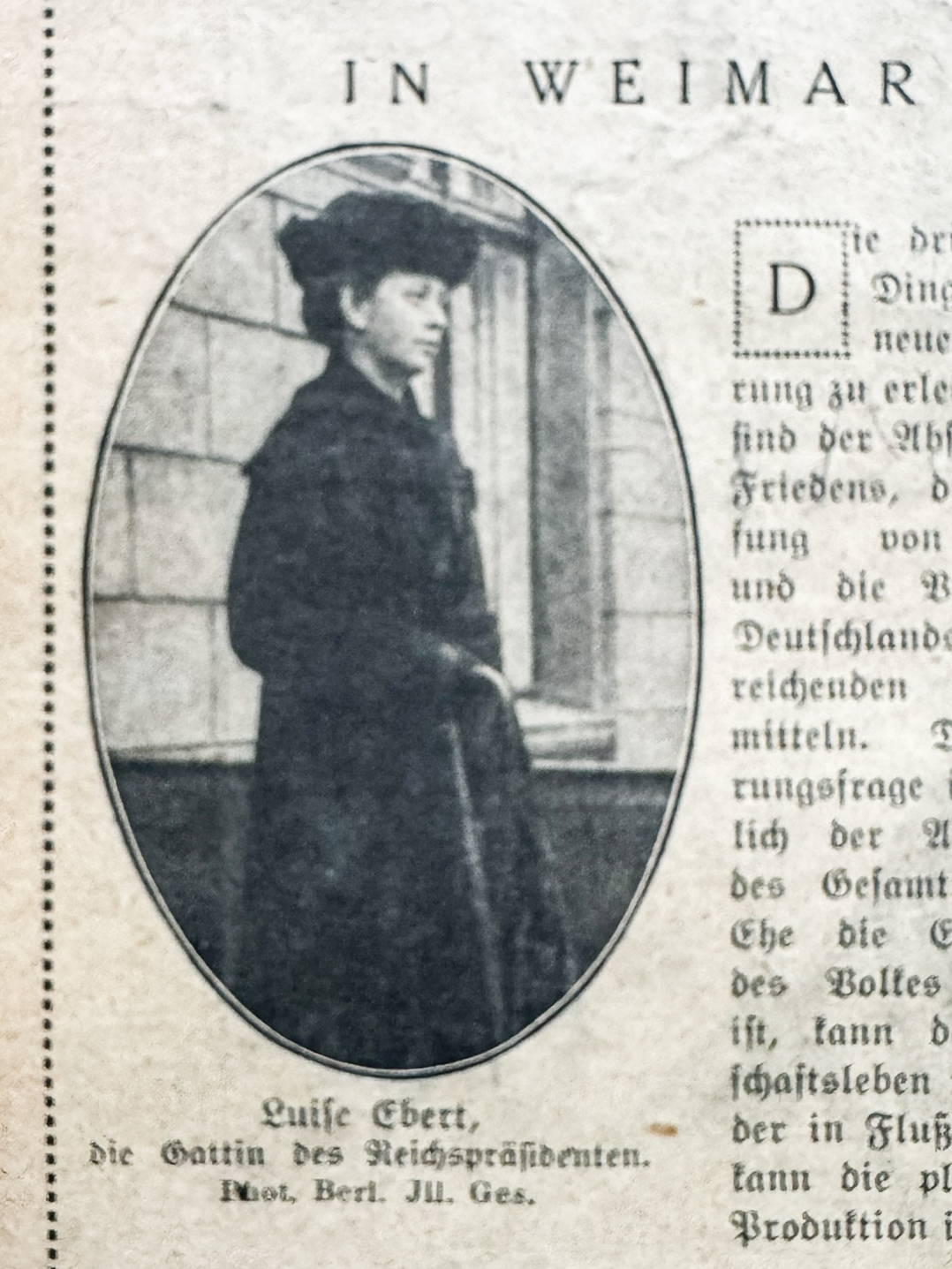
Louise Ebert, wife of Frederich Ebert
