= Elke Büdenbender =

German jurist (born 1962)

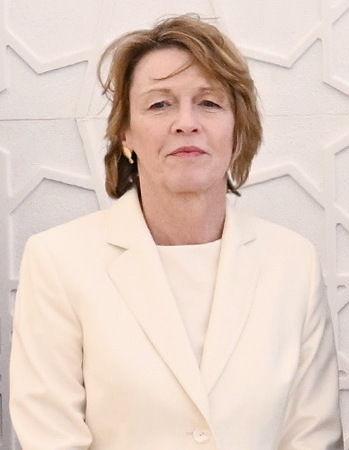
- Elke Büdenbender in 2025

Spouse of the President of Germany
- Incumbent
- Assumed role 19 March 2017
- President: Frank-Walter Steinmeier
- Preceded by: Daniela Schadt

Personal details
- Born: Elke Büdenbender; 14 January 1962 (age 64) Weidenau, West Germany
- Spouse: Frank-Walter Steinmeier (m. 1995)
- Children: 1

Elke Büdenbender (born 14 January 1962) is a German former judge. She is also the wife of Frank-Walter Steinmeier, the current President of Germany.

== Early life ==
Büdenbender attended intermediate secondary school in Siegen, after which she trained as an industrial clerk at a company in the machine building industry in Siegen. In 1982 she attended Siegerland College in Siegen and then worked as a clerk at a logistics company. In 1985, she began her degree in law at Justus Liebig University in Giessen, where she passed her first state law examination in 1991.

== Career ==
From 1987, Büdenbender worked as a student assistant and later as a research assistant to Professor Brun-Otto Bryde at the Chair of Public Law. She completed her practical legal training at Hanover Regional Court in 1994, when she passed her second state law examination.

Thereafter, Büdenbender worked as a judge at Hanover Administrative Court. From 2000, she was a judge at the Berlin Administrative Court. From 2017 to 2022, she was on long-term leave during her husband's first term as president in order to devote her time to being the first lady. From 2022 to 2025, she returned to the court again before retiring.

== Other activities ==
- Anne Frank Educational Centre, Member of the Board of Trustees
- German-Israeli Future Forum, Member of the Board of Trustees

== Personal life ==
In 1995 Büdenbender married Frank-Walter Steinmeier, who was elected as the twelfth President of Germany on 12 February 2017. They have one daughter. On 24 August 2010, she received a kidney transplant that was donated by her husband.

== Honours ==
=== Foreign Honours ===
- Austria: Grand Decoration of Honour in Gold with Sash of the Decoration of Honour for Services to the Republic of Austria (21 October 2025)
- Belgium: Grand Cordon of the Order of Leopold (5 December 2023)
- Denmark: Dame Grand Cross of the Order of the Dannebrog (19 November 2021)
- Finland: Grand Cross of the Order of the White Rose of Finland (17 September 2018)
- Iceland: Grand Cross of the Order of the Falcon (16 June 2019)
- Italy: Grand Cross of the Order of Merit of the Italian Republic (17 September 2019)
- Latvia: Commander Grand Cross of the Order of the Three Stars (19 February 2019)
- Netherlands: Dame Grand Cross of the Order of the Crown (5 July 2021)
- Spain:
  - Dame Grand Cross of the Order of Isabella the Catholic (11 October 2022)
  - Dame Grand Cross of the Order of Civil Merit (25 November 2025)
- Sweden: Commander Grand Cross of the Royal Order of the Polar Star (7 September 2021)

Unofficial roles
Preceded by Daniela Schadt as Companion of the President	Spouse of the President of Germany; 2017–present	Incumbent
