= Daniela Schadt =

German journalist

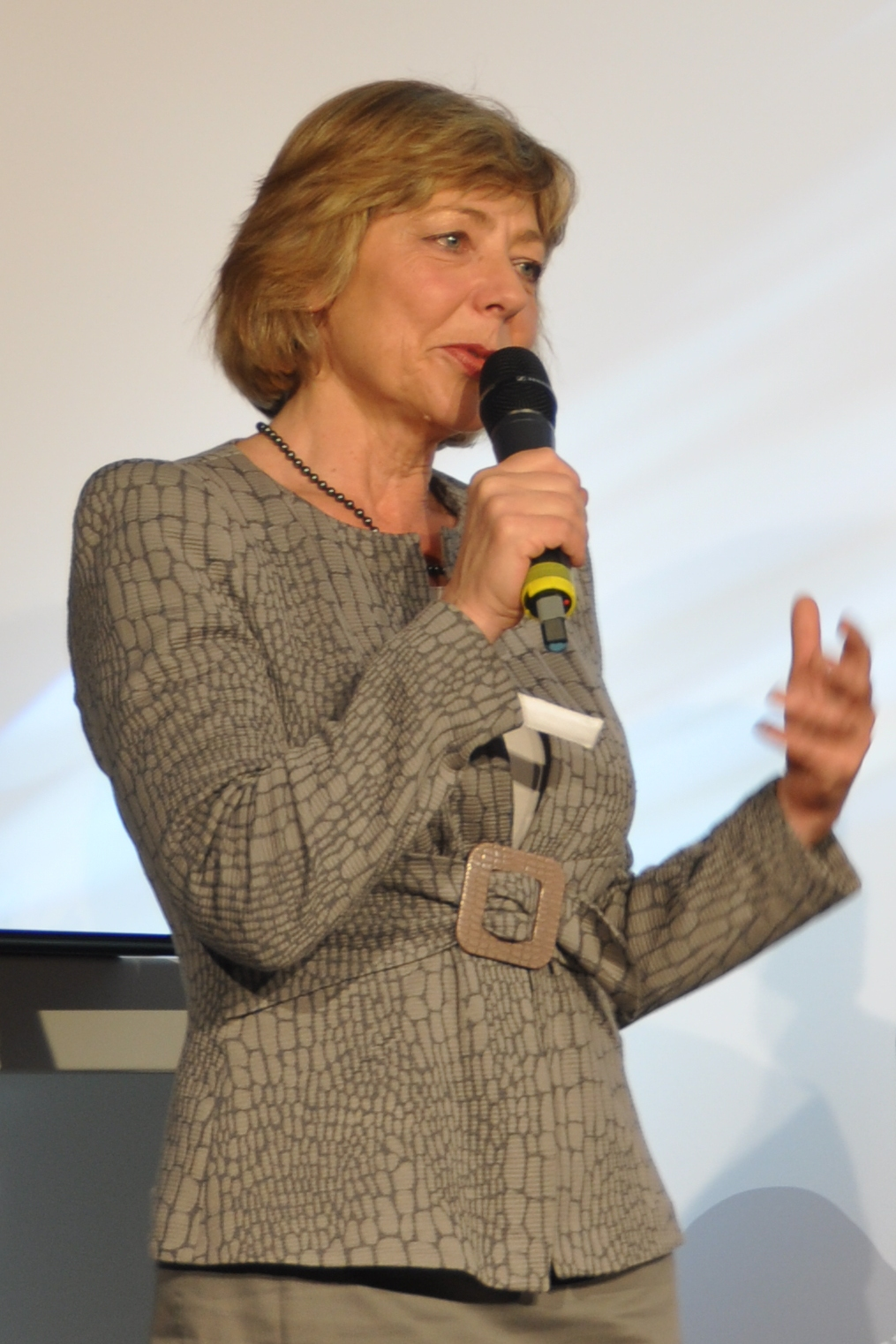
- Daniela Schadt in 2017

Companion of the President of Germany
- In role 18 March 2012 – 18 March 2017
- President: Joachim Gauck
- Preceded by: Bettina Wulff
- Succeeded by: Elke Büdenbender

Personal details
- Born: Daniela Schadt; 3 January 1960 (age 66) Hanau, West Germany
- Domestic partner(s): Joachim Gauck (2000–present)
- Education: University of Frankfurt
- Occupation: Journalist and Editor

Daniela Schadt (born 3 January 1960 in Hanau, West Germany) is a German journalist, and, since 2000, the domestic partner of Joachim Gauck, former president of Germany, who has been legally married since 1959 to Gerhild Radtke. She has sometimes been referred to by the media as "First Lady".

== Early life and education ==
Daniela Schadt studied German, French, and politics at the University of Frankfurt.

== Career ==
In 1985, Schadt became an editor at the Nürnberger Zeitung and was in charge of the German politics section. Upon the election of Gauck as President, she left the newspaper.

== Other activities ==
- Jewish Museum Berlin, Member of the Board of Trustees
- UNICEF National Committee of Germany, Member

== Honours ==
=== Foreign Honours ===
- Belgium: Grand Cordon of the Order of Leopold
- Estonia: First Class of the Order of the Cross of Terra Mariana
- France: Grand Cross of the National Order of Merit
- Latvia: Commander Grand Cross of the Order of the Three Stars (3 July 2013)
- Lithuania: Grand Cross of the Order of Vytautas the Great
- Norway: Grand Cross of the Royal Norwegian Order of Merit
- Sweden: Member Grand Cross of the Order of the Polar Star

Unofficial roles
| Preceded by Bettina Wulff as Spouse of the President | Companion of the President of Germany; 2012–2017 | Succeeded by Elke Büdenbender as Spouse of the President |
