= Karl Carstens =

German politician (1914–1992)

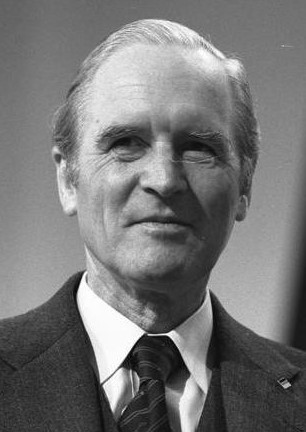
- Carstens in 1978

President of Germany (Note: Due to the division of Germany, Walter Scheel was only the President of West Germany. The term West Germany is the common English name for the Federal Republic of Germany between its formation on 23 May 1949 and the German reunification through the accession of East Germany on 3 October 1990.)
- In office 1 July 1979 – 30 June 1984
- Chancellor: Helmut Schmidt; Helmut Kohl
- Preceded by: Walter Scheel
- Succeeded by: Richard von Weizsäcker

President of the Bundestag
- In office 14 December 1976 – 31 May 1979
- Preceded by: Annemarie Renger
- Succeeded by: Richard Stücklen

Bundestag Leader of the CDU/CSU Group
- In office 17 May 1973 – 1 December 1976
- Preceded by: Kurt Georg Kiesinger (acting)
- Succeeded by: Helmut Kohl

Chief of the Federal Chancellery
- In office 1 January 1968 – 22 October 1969
- Chancellor: Kurt Georg Kiesinger
- Preceded by: Werner Knieper
- Succeeded by: Horst Ehmke

Member of the Bundestag for Ostholstein
- In office 3 October 1976 – 1 July 1979
- Preceded by: Constituency established
- Succeeded by: Günther Jansen

Member of the Bundestag for Schleswig-Holstein
- In office 19 November 1972 – 3 October 1976

Personal details
- Born: 14 December 1914 Bremen, Germany
- Died: 30 May 1992 (aged 77) Meckenheim, Germany
- Party: Christian Democratic Union (1955–1992)
- Other political affiliations: Nazi Party (1940–1945)
- Spouse: Veronica Prior
- Education: Yale University; University of Dijon; Goethe University Frankfurt; Ludwig-Maximilians-Universität München; University of Königsberg; University of Hamburg
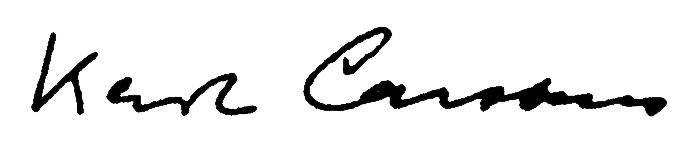
- Signature

Karl Carstens (German: [kaʁl ˈkaʁstn̩s]; 14 December 1914 – 30 May 1992) was a German politician. He served as the president of West Germany from 1979 to 1984.

== Early life and education ==
Carstens was born in the City of Bremen, the son of a commercial school teacher, who had been killed at the Western Front of World War I shortly before his birth. He studied law and political science at Goethe University Frankfurt, the University of Dijon, the Ludwig-Maximilians-Universität München, the University of Königsberg, and the University of Hamburg from 1933 to 1936, obtaining a doctorate in 1938 and taking the Second Staatsexamen degree in 1939. In 1949, he also received a Master of Laws (LL.M.) degree from Yale Law School.

== World War II ==
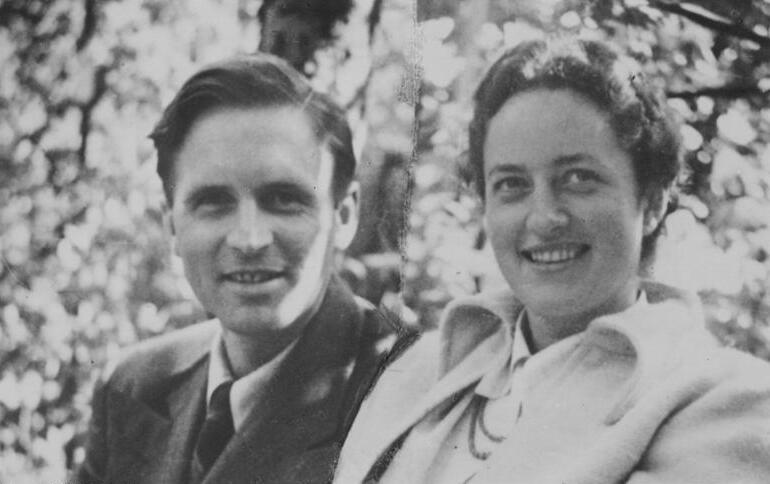
Karl and Veronica Carstens in 1949

From 1939 to 1945, during the Second World War, Carstens was a member of an anti-aircraft artillery (Flak) unit in the Luftwaffe, reaching the rank of Leutnant (Second Lieutenant) by the war's end. In 1940, he joined the Nazi Party; reportedly, he had applied for admission in 1937 to avoid detrimental treatment when he worked as a law clerk. He had, however, joined the Nazi SA paramilitary organisation already in 1934.

== Post-war years ==
In 1944, Carstens married the medical student Veronica Prior in Berlin. After the war, he became a lawyer in his hometown Bremen, and from 1949 acted as a councillor of the city's Senate. From 1950, he also worked as a lecturer at the University of Cologne, where he habilitated two years later. In 1954, he joined the diplomatic service of the German Foreign Office, serving as West German representative at the Council of Europe in Strasbourg. In 1955, he joined the Christian Democratic Union (CDU) under Chancellor Konrad Adenauer.

In July 1960, Carstens reached the position of Secretary of State at the Foreign Office and in the same year was also appointed as professor for public and international law at the University of Cologne. During the grand coalition government of 1966–1969 under Chancellor Kurt Georg Kiesinger, he first served as Secretary of State in the Ministry of Defence, and after 1968 as head of the German Chancellery.

In 1972, Carstens was first elected into the Bundestag, of which he was a member until 1979. From May 1973 until October 1976, he was chairman of the CDU/CSU parliamentary group, succeeding Rainer Barzel. During that time, he was an outspoken critic of left-wing tendencies in the German student movement and particularly accused the governing Social Democratic Party of Germany (SPD) of being too soft on left-wing extremists. He also famously denounced the author and Nobel laureate Heinrich Böll as a supporter of left-wing terrorism (specifically, the Baader-Meinhof Gang) for his 1974 novel The Lost Honour of Katharina Blum.

After the 1976 federal elections, which made the CDU/CSU the largest group in parliament, Carstens was elected president of the Bundestag on 14 December 1976. The CDU/CSU had also reached a majority in the Federal Convention electing the President of Germany, and in 1979 the party nominated Carstens, though in contestation due to his Nazi past, as candidate, whereafter incumbent President Walter Scheel (FDP) chose to renounce a second term.

== President of West Germany ==
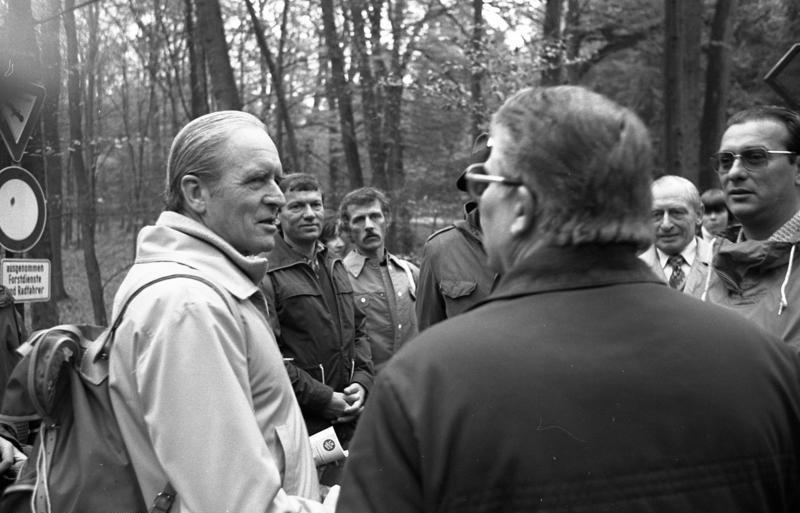
The hiking president, 1979

On 23 May 1979, Carstens was elected as the fifth President of the Federal Republic of Germany, prevailing against the SPD candidate Annemarie Renger in the first ballot. During his term of office, Carstens was well known for hiking in Germany in order to decrease the gulf between politics and the people.

In December 1982, the new Chancellor Helmut Kohl (CDU), recently elected in a successful motion of no confidence against Helmut Schmidt (SPD), deliberately lost a vote of confidence in the Bundestag, in order to obtain a clearer majority in new general elections. Though already former Chancellor Willy Brandt had similarly proceeded in 1972, this action gave rise to a discussion whether such a step constitutes a "manipulation of the Constitution". On 7 January 1983, President Carstens nonetheless dissolved the Bundestag and called for new elections. In February 1983, his decision was approved by the Federal Constitutional Court so that 1983 general elections could take place on 6 March.

In 1984, Carstens decided not to seek a second term on account of his age and left office on 30 June 1984. He was succeeded by Richard von Weizsäcker.

Carstens was a member of the Protestant Church in Germany.

== Literature ==
- Michael F. Feldkamp (ed.), Der Bundestagspräsident. Amt - Funktion - Person. 16. Wahlperiode, Munich 2007 ISBN 978-3-7892-8201-0

== Notes ==
Political offices
Preceded by Annemarie Renger	President of the Bundestag; 1976–1979	Succeeded by Richard Stücklen
Preceded by Walter Scheel	President of West Germany; 1979–1984	Succeeded by Richard von Weizsäcker
