= Johannes Rau =

President of Germany from 1999 to 2004

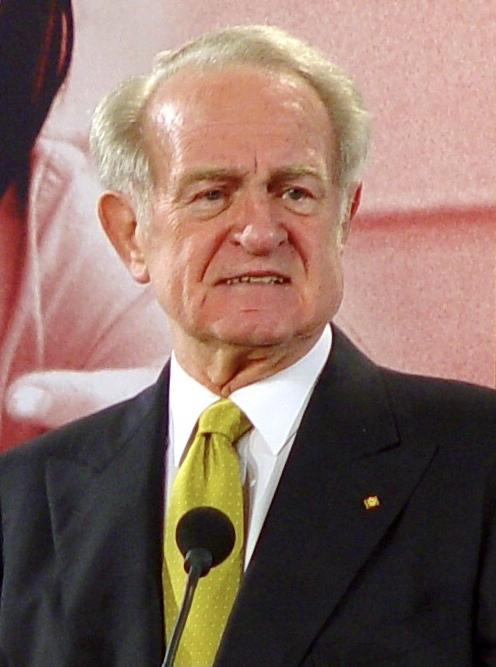
- Rau in 2004

President of Germany
- In office 1 July 1999 – 30 June 2004
- Chancellor: Gerhard Schröder
- Preceded by: Roman Herzog
- Succeeded by: Horst Köhler

Minister-President of North Rhine-Westphalia
- In office 20 September 1978 – 9 June 1998
- Deputy: Horst-Ludwig Riemer; Burkhard Hirsch; Diether Posser; Herbter Schnoor; Michael Vesper
- Preceded by: Heinz Kühn
- Succeeded by: Wolfgang Clement

President of the Bundesrat
- In office 1 November 1994 – 31 October 1995
- First Vice President: Klaus Wedemeier
- Preceded by: Klaus Wedemeier
- Succeeded by: Edmund Stoiber
- In office 1 November 1982 – 31 October 1983
- First Vice President: Hans Koschnick
- Preceded by: Hans Koschnick
- Succeeded by: Franz Josef Strauss
North Rhine-Westphalia Cabinet
Minister for Federal Affairs
In office 4 June 1980 – 18 August 1980
Minister-President	himself
Preceded by	Christoph Zöpel
Succeeded by	Dieter Haak
Minister of Science and Research
In office 28 July 1970 – 20 September 1978
Minister-President	Heinz Kühn
Preceded by	Office established
Succeeded by	Reimut Jochimsen

Lord Mayor of Wuppertal
- In office 1969–1970
- Preceded by: Hermann Herberts
- Succeeded by: Gottfried Gurland
Parliamentary constituencies
Member of the Landtag of North Rhine-Westphalia for Wuppertal III
In office 21 July 1958 – 30 June 1999
Preceded by	Constituency established
Succeeded by	Marianne Dohmen

Personal details
- Born: 16 January 1931 Wuppertal, Germany
- Died: 27 January 2006 (aged 75) Berlin, Germany
- Resting place: Dorotheenstädtisch-Friedrichwerderscher Friedhof I, Berlin
- Party: Social Democratic Party (1957–2006)
- Other political affiliations: All-German People's Party (1950–1957)
- Spouse: Christina Rau (m. 1982)
- Children: 3
- Occupation: Politician; Publisher

Johannes Rau (German: [joˈhanəs ˈʁaʊ]; 16 January 1931 – 27 January 2006) was a German politician who served as President of Germany from 1999 to 2004. A member of the Social Democratic Party, he previously served as the Minister-President of North Rhine-Westphalia from 1978 to 1998. In the latter role, he also served as President of the Bundesrat in 1982–1983 and in 1994–1995.

== Education and work ==
Rau was born in the Barmen part of Wuppertal, Rhine Province, as the third of five children. His family was strongly Protestant. As a schoolboy, Rau was active in the Confessing Church, which resisted Nazism. Rau left school in 1949 and worked as a publisher, especially with the Protestant Youth Publishing House.

== Political career ==
Rau was a member of the All-German People's Party (GVP), which was founded by Gustav Heinemann. The party was known for proposing German reunification from 1952 until it was disbanded in 1957.

In 1958, the pacifist Rau and his political mentor, Gustav Heinemann, joined the Social Democratic Party of Germany (SPD), where he was active in the Wuppertal chapter. He served as deputy chairman of the SPD party of Wuppertal and was elected later on to the City Council (1964–1978), where he served as chairman of the SPD Group (1964–1967) and later as Mayor (1969–1970).

In July 1958, Rau was elected for the first time as a member of the Landtag of North Rhine-Westphalia. In 1967, he became chairman of the SPD fraction in the Landtag, and from 1970 to 1975, he was Minister of Science and Education in the second cabinet of Minister President Heinz Kühn. He soon gained a reputation as a reformer. As part of the mass education campaign of the 1970s, he founded five universities, each at different sites, in North Rhine-Westphalia and initiated Germany's first distance learning university at Hagen (modelled on the British Open University).

In 1977, Rau became Chairman of the SPD North Rhine-Westphalia and, in 1978, Minister President of the state, which he remained until 1998, with four successful elections for the SPD, which became strongest party in the Landtag each time and gained an absolute majority three times, in 1980, 1985, 1990 and finally 1995. From 1995 onwards, Rau led an SPD-Greens coalition in North Rhine-Westphalia. Rau twice served as President of the Bundesrat in 1982–1983 and 1994–1995.

In 1987, Rau was his party's candidate to become chancellor of Germany for the SPD, but he lost the 1987 West German federal election against Helmut Kohl's Christian Democrats (CDU). In 1994, Rau was a candidate to become President of Germany but lost the 1994 German presidential election to Roman Herzog.

In June 1998, Rau stepped down from his positions as SPD chairman and Minister President, and in the 1999 German presidential election on 23 May 1999, he was elected President of Germany by the Federal Assembly of Germany to succeed Roman Herzog (CDU).

On 1 July 2004, he was succeeded by Horst Köhler. In common with all other Federal presidents Rau was honored by a Großer Zapfenstreich. At his request the hymn "Jesus bleibet meine Freude" (literally "that Jesus remain my Joy", but commonly Jesu, Joy of Man's Desiring) was included.

In February 2000, Rau became the first German head of state to address the Knesset, the Israeli parliament, in German.

The controversial step prompted some Israeli delegates to walk out. However, Israeli President Moshe Katsav supported and praised him for bridging the gap between the two states. Rau had a deep and lifelong commitment to bringing reconciliation between Germany and its past.

== Death ==
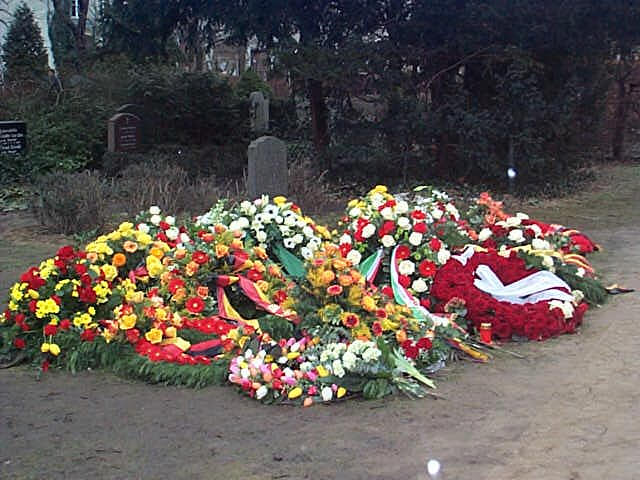
Rau's grave the day after his burial

Rau had a long history of heart disease and died 11 days after his 75th birthday on 27 January 2006. The funeral took place on 7 February following a funeral act of state at the Dorotheenstadt cemetery in Berlin in the closest of family and friends.

== Motto and maxim ==
The maxim of Rau was "to reconcile, not divide".

As his personal motto, Rau adopted the Confessing Church dictum "teneo, quia teneor" ("I hold because I am held").

In his acceptance speech after his election, Rau claimed, "I never want to be a nationalist but rather a patriot. A patriot is someone who loves his fatherland. A nationalist is someone who condemns the fatherland of others." The quote can be attributed to the French writer Romain Gary.

== Private life ==
Rau was known as a practising Christian (sometimes known as Bruder Johannes, "Brother John", in reference to his intense Christian faith). He held lay positions in and was a member of the Synod of the Evangelical Church in the Rhineland, a member church of the Protestant Church in Germany.

On 9 August 1982, Rau married the political scientist Christina Delius (born 1956). Christina Rau is a granddaughter of her husband's mentor, Gustav Heinemann, former President of Germany. The couple had three children: Anna Christina, born 1983, Philip Immanuel, born 1985 and Laura Helene, born 1986.

On 18 August 2004, Rau had to undergo serious heart surgery, in which an artificial heart valve was inserted. Only two months later (19 October 2004), a hematoma in the abdominal cavity was surgically removed. After leaving office, Rau lived with his family in the federal capital, Berlin. However, they also kept a house in Wuppertal.

== Honours ==
- Germany: Grand Cross Special Class of the Order of Merit of the Federal Republic of Germany

=== Foreign honours ===
- Austria: Grand Star of the Decoration of Honour for Services to the Republic of Austria (2004)
- Czech Republic: Collar of the Order of the White Lion (2000)
- Denmark: Knight of the Order of the Elephant (2002)
- Estonia: Collar of the Order of the Cross of Terra Mariana
- Italy: Knight Grand Cross with Collar Order of Merit of the Italian Republic
- Iceland: Grand Cross with Collar of the Order of the Falcon (2003)
- Latvia: Member 2nd Class, then, 1st Class with Chain of the Order of the Three Stars
- Malta: Honorary Companions of Honour with Collar of the National Order of Merit
- Norway: Grand Cross of the Order of St. Olav
- Poland: Knight of the Order of the White Eagle
- Slovakia: Grand Cross (or 1st Class) of the Order of the White Double Cross (2001)
- Spain: Knight of the Collar of the Order of Isabella the Catholic (2002)
- Sweden: Knight of the Royal Order of the Seraphim
- Turkey: Member 1st Class of the Order of the State of Republic of Turkey (2000)
- Vatican: Knight with the Collar of the Order of Pope Pius IX
- Olympic Order (2004)
- Leo Baeck Medal (1996)

== See also ==
- Politics of Germany

Political offices
Preceded by Heinz Kühn	Minister-President of North Rhine-Westphalia; 1978–1998	Succeeded by Wolfgang Clement
Preceded by Hans Koschnick	President of the German Bundesrat; 1982–1983	Succeeded by Franz Josef Strauss
Preceded by Klaus Wedemeier	President of the German Bundesrat; 1994–1995	Succeeded by Edmund Stoiber
Preceded by Roman Herzog	President of Germany; 1999–2004	Succeeded by Horst Köhler
Party political offices
Preceded by Björn Engholm	Leader of the Social Democratic Party; 1993	Succeeded by Rudolf Scharping
