= Bettina Wulff =

Spouse of former German President (born 1973)

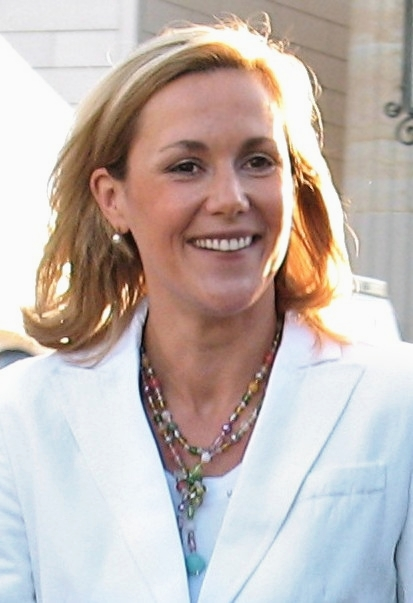
- Bettina Wulff in 2010

Spouse of the President of Germany
- In role 30 June 2010 – 17 February 2012
- President: Christian Wulff
- Preceded by: Eva Köhler
- Succeeded by: Daniela Schadt

Personal details
- Born: Bettina Körner; 25 October 1973 (age 53) Hanover, West Germany
- Spouses: Christian Wulff (m. 2008; div. 2020) (m. 2023; div. 2025)
- Children: 2
- Education: University of Music, Drama and Media Hanover

Bettina Wulff (née Körner; 25 October 1973) is the wife of the former German President Christian Wulff and was therefore sometimes referred to by the media as the "First Lady" during her husband's presidency.

== Early life and family ==
Bettina Körner was born 25 October 1973 in Hanover, Lower Saxony, the second child of Inge and Horst Körner. She spent her childhood in the town of Großburgwedel and was raised as a Protestant.

Körner married Christian Wulff on 3 March 2008. Their son, Linus Florian was born two months later. Christian and Bettina Wulff each have a child from previous relationships. He had been married to his wife Christiane for 18 years before announcing their divorce in June 2006. He and his former wife have a daughter, Annalena. Bettina Wulff also has a son, Leander Balthasar (born 2003), from an earlier relationship.

== Education and career ==
After completing Abitur at the Leibnizschule in Hanover in 1993, Wulff studied media management and applied media sciences at the University of Music, Drama and Media Hanover and was enrolled there until 2000. Between 1998 and 2000, she worked as a public relations assistant for an internet agency. After that she was employed as a press officer for a car manufacturing supplier and later for a pharmacy chain. In February 2012, after her husband's resignation from the Office of German President and in the wake of a scandal about alleged corruption, she founded the public relations agency Bettina Wulff Kommunikation.

== Personal life ==
Wulff was 36 years old when her husband was elected President; she became a media star for "her looks and her glamour, her height and her elegance"; the tabloid press was fascinated by the fact that she had a tattoo, "as if it were a badge of hipness".

=== Charity ===
Wulff is a patron of the "Eine Chance für Kinder" (A Chance for Children) Foundation, which aims to support expectant mothers, young mothers, babies and toddlers facing difficult social situations. She is also a patron of the "Deutsche Kinder- und Jugendstiftung" (German Children and Youth Foundation) and "Müttergenesungswerk" (Maternal Health Care Foundation).

== Lawsuit ==
In 2012, she undertook legal action against Google, TV host Günther Jauch, and 34 other German and foreign bloggers and media, which led to cease and desist orders. The centrepiece of the associated lawsuit is Google's autocomplete feature, because the search engine would suggest terms such as "escort" and "prostitute" when searching for Wulff's name. The autocomplete results were generated as a result of unsubstantiated rumors about Wulff spread by gossip sites and blogs. Wulff had concerns that the autocomplete suggestions would be interpreted by users as a statement of fact. According to a survey by a polling group for the tabloid Bild am Sonntag, 81% of Germans had never heard the rumours before she started her campaign.

=== Book ===
Published in September 2012, Wulff wrote an autobiography (co-authored by Nicole Maibaum) titled Jenseits des Protokolls (Off Protocol) in which, inter alia, she refutes the rumours of having worked as an escort or prostitute. She also discussed marital problems and disclosed they were seeing a marriage counselor. In January 2013, the couple announced their separation with him moving out of their countryside house and into a rented flat in Hanover. They started divorce proceedings in March 2015, but only two months later they got together again and stopped the proceedings.

== Honours ==
- (Netherlands) Grand Cross of the Order of the Crown

Unofficial roles
Preceded by Eva Köhler	Spouse of the President of Germany; 2010–2012	Succeeded by Daniela Schadt as Companion of the President
