= Marianne von Weizsäcker =

German widow of President Richard von Weizsäcker

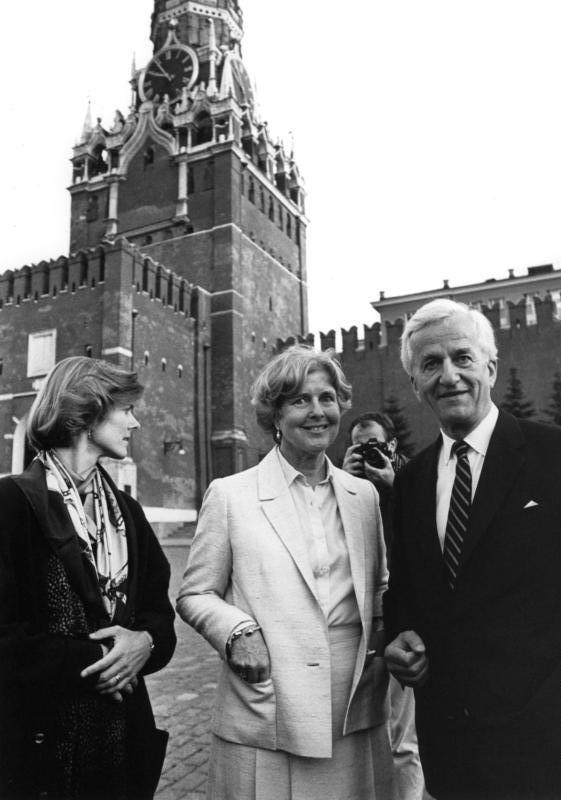
The President and his wife, 1987

Marianne Viktoria Armgard Helene Doria Freifrau von Weizsäcker (née von Kretschmann; 17 May 1932) is the widow of Richard von Weizsäcker, the President of West Germany and reunited Germany from 1984 to 1994.

== Early life ==
Von Weizsäcker was born Marianne Viktoria Armgard Helene Doria von Kretschmann on 17 May 1932 in Essen. Her mother, Asta, was the adopted daughter of prominent banker and industrialist Fritz von Waldthausen.

== Personal life ==
Marianne and Richard von Weizsäcker were married from 1953 until his death on 31 January 2015. They have four children, including Robert K. von Weizsäcker, Professor of Economics. Two of her four children have predeceased her.

Her husband served as Governing Mayor of Berlin (West Berlin) from 1981 to 1984, when he was elected president. He was reelected for a second term in 1989.

== Patronage ==
During her husband's tenure, Marianne von Weizsäcker was the patron of several charitable organisations, including the Müttergenesungswerk. She is patron of the Marianne von Weizsäcker Stiftung Integrationshilfe für ehemals Suchtkranke e. V., an organisation for the assistance of recovering addicts which she founded in 1989.

== Honours ==
=== Foreign honours ===
- Malaysia:
  - Honorary Recipient of the Order of the Crown of the Realm (1987)
- Norway:
  - Grand Cross of the Order of St. Olav (1986)
