= Heuss =

Heuss may refer to:

- Elly Heuss-Knapp (1881–1952), German politician
- Theodor Heuss (1884–1963), West German liberal politician who served as the first President of the Federal Republic of Germany from 1949 to 1959
- Heuss l'Enfoiré (born 1992), French rapper of Algerian descent

== See also ==
- Theodor-Heuss-Platz, Berlin
- Theodor Heuss Bridge (Mainz-Wiesbaden), an arch bridge over the Rhine River
- Theodor Heuss Bridge (Düsseldorf), a cable-stayed bridge over the Rhine River in Düsseldorf
- Theodor Heuss Bridge (Frankenthal), a bridge that spans the Rhine River along Autobahn 6
- Theodor-Heuss-Gymnasium Heilbronn
