= Mildred Scheel =

German physician

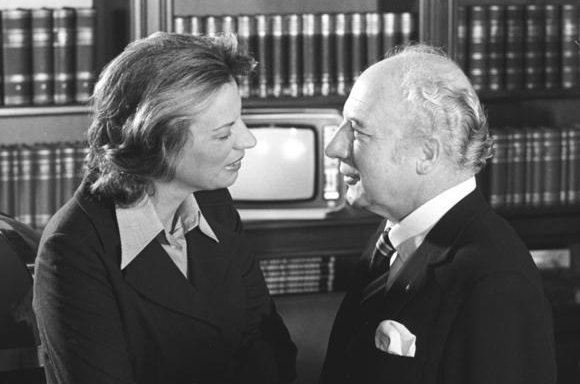
Mildred and Walter Scheel.

Mildred Scheel (born Mildred Wirtz; 31 December 1931 in Cologne – 13 May 1985 in Cologne) was a German physician, the second wife of the President of the Federal Republic Walter Scheel and the founder of the German Cancer Aid.

== Life and work ==
Mildred Scheel was the third child of a radiologist and his American wife. Already as a child, she was very much interested in medicine and often accompanied her father in his practice. The family left the bombed-out Cologne in 1944, and moved to Amberg.

== After high school ==
In 1950 she started her university medical studies in Munich, Innsbruck and Regensburg. Her first job was as a doctor in Munich. Then she worked in various hospitals and medical practices. In 1963, her daughter Cornelia was born.

In 1967 Mildred Wirtz met her future husband in a sanatorium which she was working at that time. The FDP politician was recovering there after a kidney stone operation. On 18 July 1969 they married in Munich-Schwabing and moved to Bonn. In October of that year, Walter Scheel was appointed minister of the exterior. The couple had two children, a daughter and an adopted orphan from Bolivia.

== Public life ==
With the election of Walter Scheel to the office of the Federal President on 15 May 1974, a new life of public service began for Mildred Scheel, with new responsibilities and obligations. According to the tradition of former German First Ladies Elly Heuss-Knapp and Wilhelmine Lübke (wife of the late president Heinrich Lübke), Dr. Scheel chose a social and public health role: the fight against cancer. "This can be more successful, only if all the citizens show solidarity in this important fight”, said Scheel in an announcement. She was very active in mobilizing the German public to make donations for this “health-project to benefit everybody”. Even while on state visits, she collected donations for the organization. In 1980, long time friend Andy Warhol immortalized her image with a limited edition screen-print published to raise funds for the German Cancer Aid.

== Her life's work ==
With the establishment of the German Cancer Aid in 1974, the foundation stone was laid for the future non-profit life work of Mildred Scheel. From the very beginning, her organization was marked by the fact that no tax money was expected and no donations were ever accepted from the pharmaceutical industry. "We must be completely independent of political and economic interests. We only have to serve the people's health and remain committed", was her credo. Mildred Scheel broke the taboo in society and started an open and free public discussion about cancer in general, and especially about uterine cancer, breast cancer and prostate cancer in particular. Shortly after founding the German Cancer Aid, Mildred Scheel had succeeded in winning over the medical profession to cooperate in these efforts. She initiated the first scientific medical conferences of cancer experts from Europe, United States and Asia. In 1985 she died of complications from cancer. She kept the diagnosis secret from everybody except her family and very close friends. The Honorary grave of Mildred Scheel is located at the Old Cemetery in Bonn.

== Honors and awards ==
The major honors awarded to Mildred Scheel include more than 20 state medals of honor. She received the 1976 German Media Prize Bambi. In the following years 1977, 1978 and 1979 she was elected the Woman of the Year in Germany. Several institutions, schools and streets have been named after her: for instance, in the cities of Dresden, Solingen, Neuss and Calw. In 2008, the city of Munich posthumously honored the founder of German Cancer Aid by naming a street in the famous Schwabing district „Mildred-Scheel-Bogen” (by the decision of the City Council on 14 February 2008). It is also recalled that the doctor lived, studied and worked in the Bavarian capital Munich for many years.
