= Ethel-Michele de Villiers =

South African virologist (born 1947)

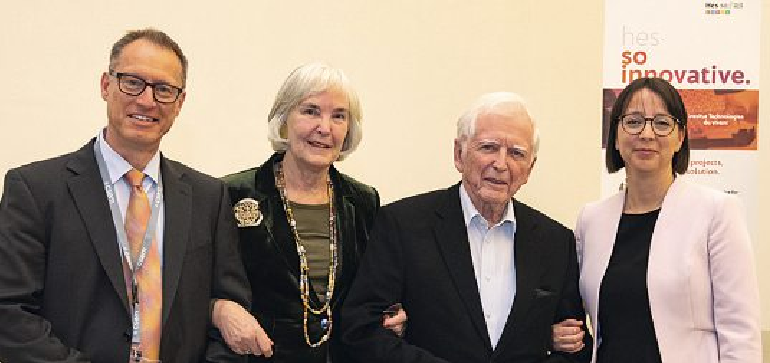
- De Villiers second from the left
- Born: 1947 (age 78–79); Pretoria, South Africa
- Education: University of Pretoria; University of Freiburg
- Known for: HPV research; BMMFs research
- Spouse: Harald zur Hausen (m. 1993; died 2023)
- Scientific career
- Fields: Virology; cancer research
- Workplaces: German Cancer Research Center

Ethel-Michele (family name: de Villiers; born 1947) is a South African virologist and cancer researcher associated with the German Cancer Research Center (German: Deutsches Krebsforschungszentrum) in Heidelberg, Germany. Her research focuses on the biology of human papillomavirus (HPV), including the characterization of HPV types associated with cervical cancer.

She also studies Bovine Meat and Milk Factors (BMMFs) as potential pathogens involved in chronic inflammation and carcinogenesis in humans.

== Early life and education ==
De Villiers was born in Pretoria, South Africa, in 1947. Her early life remains undocumented.

She completed a PhD in biology at the University of Pretoria in 1980. She later conducted research at the University of Freiburg in Germany before returning to South Africa, where she worked at the Onderstepoort Veterinary Academic Hospital.

Her early academic work focused on virology and the role of viruses in human diseases. In 1984, she joined the German Cancer Research Center, where she conducted a long-term research collaboration with virologist Harald zur Hausen, whom she married in 1993

During her time in Germany, she contributed to research on virus-induced cancers, including work identifying the link between HPVs and cervical cancer.

== Contributions ==
De Villiers contributed to research characterizing HPV types and examining their role in carcinogenesis. Her work contributed to the identification of the HPV–cervical cancer association, the discovery of which led to her collaborator Harald zur Hausen receiving the Nobel Prize in Physiology or Medicine in 2008. She expanded her research to include studies of infectious agents such as Bovine Meat and Milk Factors (BMMFs). She co-led studies on BMMFs, a group of infectious agents found in bovine products, to determine possible associations with long-term inflammation and certain types of cancer.

== Awards and recognition ==
- 2019: Emerging Microbes & Infections, Best Paper Award, third place.
