= Lutz Gissmann =

German virologist

Lutz Gissmann (born September 18, 1949, in Kaufbeuren, Germany) is a German virologist and was head of the division Genome Modifications and Carcinogenesis at the German Cancer Research Center (DKFZ) in Heidelberg until his retirement in 2015. Lutz Gissmann is known for his seminal research in the field of human papillomaviruses (HPV) and their causal association with human cancer, especially cervical cancer. In his early work, he demonstrated genetic heterogeneity among HPV isolates leading the way to the now well-established concept of distinct HPV types (up to now more than 200) of which some are associated with specific benign or malignant disease. In the early 1980s in the laboratory of later Nobel Prize laureate Harald zur Hausen he was the first (together with the postgraduates Matthias Dürst and Michael Boshart supervised by him) to isolate and characterize HPV16 and HPV18, the two most oncogenic HPV types causing the vast majority of HPV-induced anogenital and head-and-neck cancers. This groundbreaking work of Lutz Gissmann provided experimental evidence for the causal association of specific HPV types with human cancer, and laid the foundation for the development of prophylactic HPV vaccines for the prevention of cervical cancer and other HPV-induced cancers. His current research interest is on development of second generation prophylactic and therapeutic HPV vaccines.

== Professional biography ==
Gissmann obtained a diploma in biology and a PhD in Microbiology and Genetics of the University of Erlangen (Germany). Together with Harald zur Hausen he moved to the University of Freiburg as a post doc and later became assistant professor in virology. In 1983 he was appointed as head of the division Genome Modifications and Carcinogenesis at the German Cancer Research Center (DKFZ) in Heidelberg and professor of virology at the University of Heidelberg. He was on leave of absence from 1993 to 1997 as director of research in the department of Obstetrics and Gynecology and chairman of the program Viral Oncology at the Loyola University Medical Center, Chicago, USA, and from 1998 to 1999 as vice president of research and development, MediGene AG, Martinsried, Germany. Gissmann was a member of the DKFZ board of trustees (2002–2012), speaker of the research programs Applied Tumor Virology (1991–1993) and Infection and Cancer (2012–2014) and ombudsman for the PhD students at DKFZ (2004–2010). Under his guidance numerous diploma and Ph.D. students were introduced to the fascination of science and the fun side of life in a research laboratory.

Gissmann has published more than 200 peer reviewed scientific contributions, holds several patents and has written numerous book contributions. He received several honorary memberships and awards (including the Warren Alpert Foundation Prize in 2007 together with Harald zur Hausen "for work leading to the development of a vaccine against human papillomavirus").
