= Ulf Kahlert =

German biologist and cancer researcher

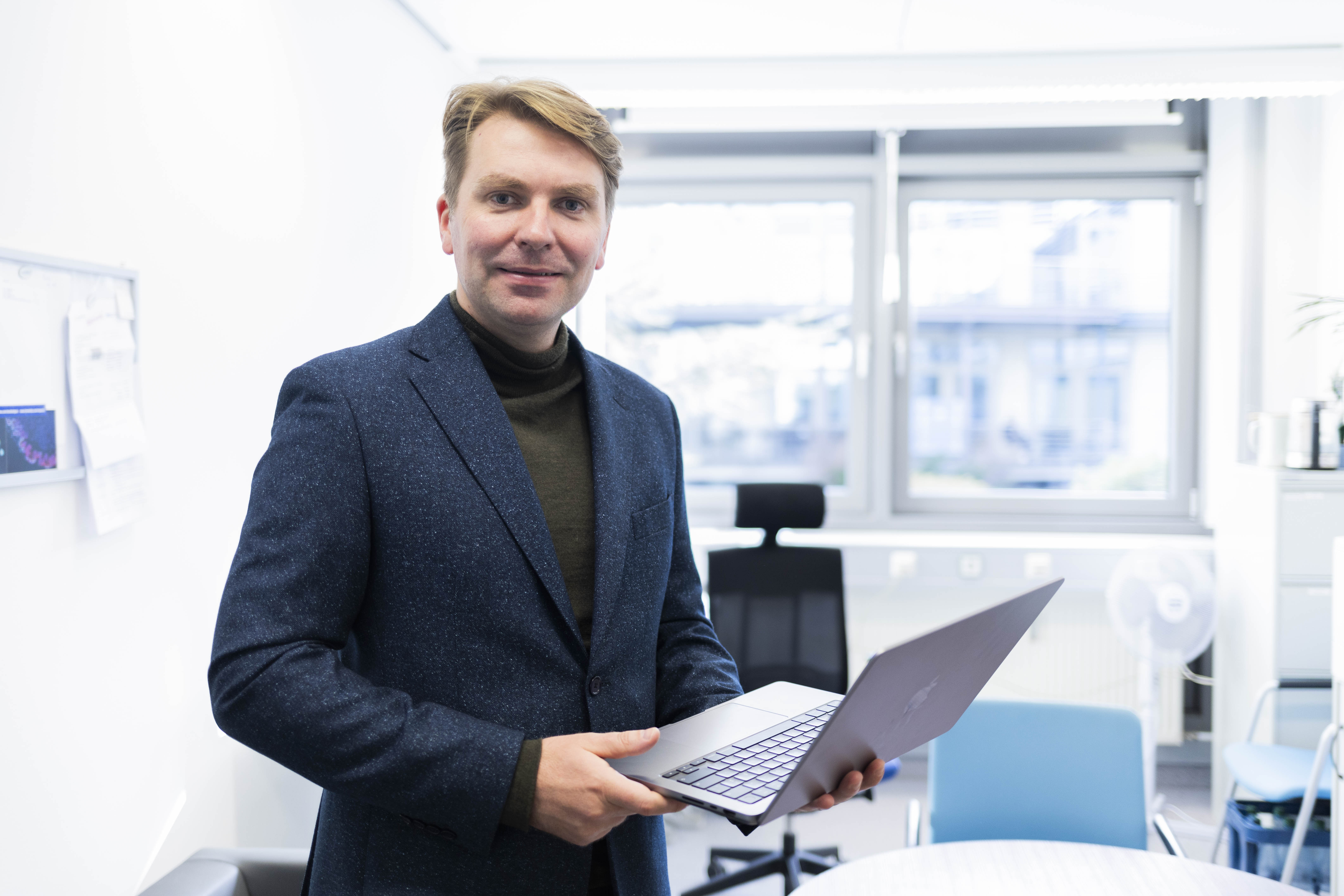
Kahlert in February 2024

Ulf Dietrich Kahlert is a German cancer researcher and stem cell biologist. He is a professor at the Medical Faculty of the Otto-von-Guericke University Magdeburg (OvGU), where he leads the Department of Molecular and Experimental Surgery at the Clinic for General, Visceral, Vascular, and Transplant Surgery. According to Google Scholar, he has an h-index of 32 (as of December 2025), more than 120 publications, and approximately 3,700 citations.

== Early life and education ==
Kahlert is the son of a physician, Ruth Kahlert, and an engineer, Jürgen Kahlert. He grew up in Dresden and studied biology at the University of Gießen, the University of Sussex in Brighton, UK, and the University of Freiburg, where he completed his diploma. He earned his PhD under the supervision of Guido Nikkhah and Wolfgang Driever in 2012 at the Faculty of Biology, focusing on cancer stem cells. As a fellow of the German Cancer Aid Foundation, he conducted postdoctoral research from 2013 to 2015 at Johns Hopkins Hospital in Baltimore, Maryland, in the laboratory of Professor Charles G. Eberhart.

== Career ==
Starting in 2015, he led the "Translational Neurotechnologies" group at the Clinic for Neurosurgery at the University Hospital Düsseldorf. In April 2021, he accepted a professorship for Molecular and Experimental Surgery at OvGU. In November 2020, he habilitated at the Medical Faculty of Heinrich Heine University Düsseldorf on the topic of stem cell technology for precision oncology and received the Venia Legendi. In April 2021, he accepted a professorship for Molecular and Experimental Surgery at the Otto von Guericke University Magdeburg. Since 2023, he has served on the scientific advisory board of the AN-Institute for Quality Assurance in Operative Medicine in Magdeburg. His research group participates in the STIMULATE research campus, a public–private partnership focused on image-guided minimally invasive medical technologies. Ulf Kahlert is the president of the Commission of International Affairs of the Medical Faculty of University of Magdeburg. He serves as chairman of the Magdeburg chapter of the German Association of University Professors and Lecturers (Deutscher Hochschulverband).

He is a co-inventor of synthetic cancer stem cell technology used for cancer drug discovery. In November 2023, Kahlert’s research team at the Universitätsmedizin Magdeburg identified microRNA signatures as potential blood-based biomarkers for the early detection of pancreatic cancer, according to an MDR science report. His work has been presented at international scientific meetings, including EANO, ESMO and EMBC 2025. He is the congress secretary of the German Surgical Research Days 2026 and serves on the editorial board of Artificial Intelligence in Surgery.
