= Otmar Wiestler =

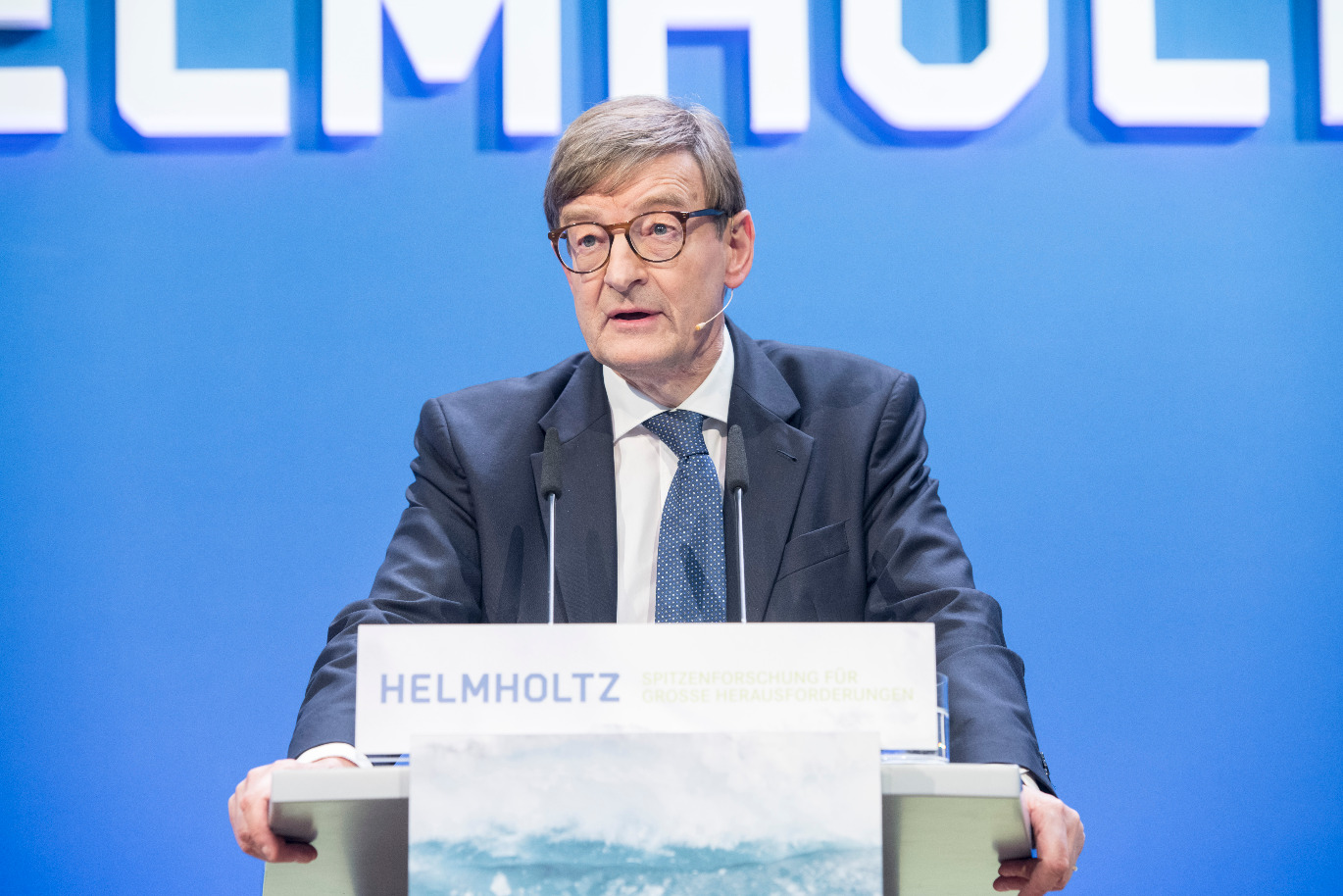
Wiestler

Otmar D. Wiestler (born 6 November 1956 in Freiburg im Breisgau) is a German physician, a professor at the University of Heidelberg and former president of the Helmholtz Association. He is not a typical basic scientist, but he successfully entered a number of highly popular fields of clinical research, including cancer research, tumor genetics and, more recently, stem cell research. He focuses on technology transfer of already existing technologies from basic science into clinical use, rather than developing the basic science.

== Career ==
From 1975 to 1981 Wiestler went to the Medical School at the Albert Ludwig University of Freiburg. Under the direction of Paul Kleihues and Benedict Volk, Wiestler worked as assistant at the University of Freiburg until 1994, when he finished his thesis with summa cum laude. As a PostDoc he joined Gernot Walter for three years at the Institute of Pathology at the University of California San Diego. From 1987 to 1992 he was staff physician at the Department of Neuropathology at the Institute of Pathology of the University Hospital in Zürich, Switzerland, again with Paul Kleihues. In 1989 he temporarily headed the department. From 1992 to 2003, he was elected full professor and chair for Neuropathology at the university clinics in Bonn.

Since 2000 Wiestler is known to the public as a supporter of stem cell research in Germany.

From 2002 to 2003 Wiestler was also CEO of LIFE & BRAIN GmbH in Bonn. In 2004, Wiestler succeeded Harald zur Hausen as Chairman and scientific member of the Foundation Board of the German Cancer Research Centre (DKFZ). In 2015 he became President of the Helmholtz Association. In 2019 he was re-elected for a second term until 2025.

== Other activities ==
=== Corporate boards ===
- Bayer AG, Member of the Supervisory Board (since 2014)
- Siemens Medical Solutions, Member of the Advisory Board of Molecular Diagnostics (since 2007)

=== Non-profit organizations ===
- Berlin Institute of Health (BIH), Member of the Supervisory Board
- Helmholtz Association of German Research Centres, Vice-President (since 2007)
- Hertie Institute for Clinical Brain Research, Member of the Board of Trustees (since 2007)
- Georg Speyer House, Member of the Board (since 2006)
- Hertie Foundation, Member of the Board of Trustees (since 2005)
- German Cancer Aid, Chairman of the Advisory Committee and Member of the Board (since 2004)
- German Future Prize, Member of the Board of Trustees
- Max Planck Institute of Molecular Cell Biology and Genetics, Member of the Board of Trustees
- German Science Foundation (DFG), Chairman of the Technical Committee Theoretical Medicine (2000–2003)
- NCCR Neural Plasticity & Repair, Member of the Review Panel (since 2001)
- German Academy of Sciences Leopoldina, Member (since 2001)
- Technical University of Munich (TUM), Chairman of the Board of Trustees (2016–2023)
- Stem Cell Network Research of North Rhine-Westphalia, Chairman (2002–2003)
- German Society for Neuropathology and Neuroanatomy, President (1998–1999)

== Awards ==
On 8 April 2005 Wiestler received the Order of Merit of the Federal Republic of Germany.

== Publications ==
Wiestler has numerous original publications in journals of the neuropathology and cancer research. He also edited several books and is in the Editorial Board of various journals.

- Wiestler, O D; Walter, G (1988). "Developmental expression of two forms of pp60c-src in mouse brain". Molecular and Cellular Biology. 8 (1). American Society for Microbiology: 502–504. doi:10.1128/mcb.8.1.502-504.1988. ISSN 0270-7306. PMC 363161. PMID 2447488.
- Wolf, Helmut K.; Wellmer, Jörg; Müller, Marianne B.; Wiestler, Otmar D.; Hufnagel, A.; Pietsch, Torsten (1995). "Glioneuronal Malformative Lesions and Dysembryoplastic Neuroepithelial Tumors in Pateints with Chroninc Pharmacoresistant Epilepsies". Journal of Neuropathology and Experimental Neurology. 54 (2). Oxford University Press (OUP): 245–254. doi:10.1097/00005072-199503000-00011. ISSN 0022-3069. PMID 7876892. S2CID 22337358.
- Eibl, RH; Kleihues, P; Jat, PS; Wiestler, OD (22 November 2004). "A model for primitive neuroectodermal tumors in transgenic neural transplants harboring the SV40 large T antigen". American Journal of Pathology. 144 (3): 556–564. PMC 1887088. PMID 8129041.
