= Theodor Heuss House Foundation =

German nonprofit organization

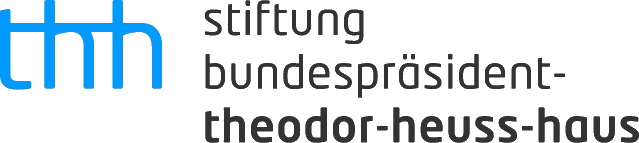
- Abbreviation: THH
- Named after: Theodor Heuss
- Established: 1994; 32 years ago
- Legal status: Foundation of public law
- Purpose: Preserving the memory of Theodor Heuss‘ political work; historical research; political education
- Location: Stuttgart, Germany
- Chairwoman: Isabel Fezer
- Trustees: Sabine Leutheusser-Schnarrenberger (Chair)
- Managing Director: Thorsten Holzhauser
- Website: www.theodor-heuss-haus.de

The President Theodor Heuss House Foundation (German: Stiftung Bundespräsident-Theodor-Heuss-Haus, Abbr. THH) in Stuttgart is a German non-partisan foundation dedicated to preserving the memory of social liberal journalist and politician Theodor Heuss, West Germany‘s first Federal President after the Second World War. It was established in 1994 by the German Bundestag to commemorate the life and work of Heuss and to "contribute to the understanding of recent history". The Foundation is active in the fields of civic education and political and historical research, focusing on the history of democracy and liberalism. It maintains the Theodor Heuss Archive as well as a public memorial centre in Heuss‘ former Stuttgart domicile, the eponymous Theodor Heuss House.

The Theodor Heuss House Foundation is publicly funded by the German Federal Government and independent from any political party. It is led by a three-member Executive Board and a five-member Board of Trustees headed by former German Federal Minister of Justice Sabine Leutheusser-Schnarrenberger as chairwoman. The founding chairman of the Board of Trustees was the German-British sociologist Ralf Dahrendorf.

== History ==
In the early 1950s, then Federal President Theodor Heuss decided to spend his retirement in Stuttgart. To this end, he had a bungalow built in a sought-after hillside location in the immediate vicinity of Villa Porsche. Following the end of his second term of office, Heuss moved into the house in 1959. After Heuss' death in 1963, the house was used for several years by the original Theodor Heuss Archive which in its first incarnation was dissolved in June 1971. The house was then rented out exclusively to private individuals in the 1970s and 1980s.

In 1994, the German Bundestag decided to establish two new federal foundations dedicated to the memory of German statesmen (Politikergedenkstiftungen), the Federal Chancellor Willy Brandt Foundation (dedicated to Willy Brandt) and the President Theodor Heuss House Foundation, both modeled after the Federal Chancellor Adenauer House Foundation (founded in 1978) and the President Friedrich Ebert Memorial (founded in 1986). The new Theodor Heuss House Foundation acquired Theodor Heuss' former Stuttgart domicile and had it remodelled, renovated and extended with an annex according to the plans of the Stuttgart architect Behnisch & Partner. After a first permanent exhibition dedicated to Theodor Heuss had been displayed between 2002 and 2021, the house underwent extensive renovation work before being reopened by Federal President Frank-Walter Steinmeier in May 2023.

== Exhibitions ==
In addition to different temporary exhibitions, three permanent exhibitions can be seen in the Theodor Heuss House in Stuttgart: Theodor Heuss' original furnishings in the style of the late 1950s can be seen in his living quarters; a historical exhibition (Demokratie als Lebensform) is dedicated to the life and work of Theodor Heuss and his wife, the social activist and politician Elly Heuss-Knapp; and an exhibition presents the functions of the German Federal President within the German constitutional framework.

== Publications ==
The Foundation published a couple of book series. The Zeithistorische Impulse series comprises edited volumes and monographs on contemporary historical research. Under the title Theodor Heuss. Stuttgarter Ausgabe, the Foundation publishes a scholarly edition of Theodor Heuss' letters, speeches and writings. The Letters series is completed with eight volumes, which were published between 2009 and 2014 and offer an annotated selection from the approximately 60,000 letters written by Heuss.
