= Lübke English =

Overly literal German-English translation

The term Lübke English (or, in German, Lübke-Englisch) refers to nonsensical English created by literal word-by-word translation of German phrases, disregarding differences between the languages in syntax and meaning.

Lübke English is named after Heinrich Lübke, a president of Germany in the 1960s, whose limited English made him a target of German humorists.

In 2006, the German magazine konkret revealed that most of the statements ascribed to Lübke were in fact invented by the editorship of Der Spiegel, mainly by staff writer Ernst Goyke and subsequent letters to the editor.

In the 1980s, comedian Otto Waalkes had a routine called "English for Runaways", which is a nonsensical literal translation of Englisch für Fortgeschrittene (actually an idiom for 'English for advanced speakers' in German – note that fortschreiten divides into fort, meaning "away" or "forward", and schreiten, meaning "to walk in steps"). In this mock "course", he translates every sentence back or forth between English and German at least once (usually from German literally into English). Though there are also other, more complex language puns, the title of this routine has gradually replaced the term Lübke English when a German speaker wants to point out naive literal translations.

== See also ==
- Fromlostiano, a similar translation from Spanish into English
