= German Cancer Research Center =

National cancer research center in Heidelberg, Germany

Coordinates: 49°24′50″N 8°40′19″E

Deutsches Krebsforschungszentrum (DKFZ)
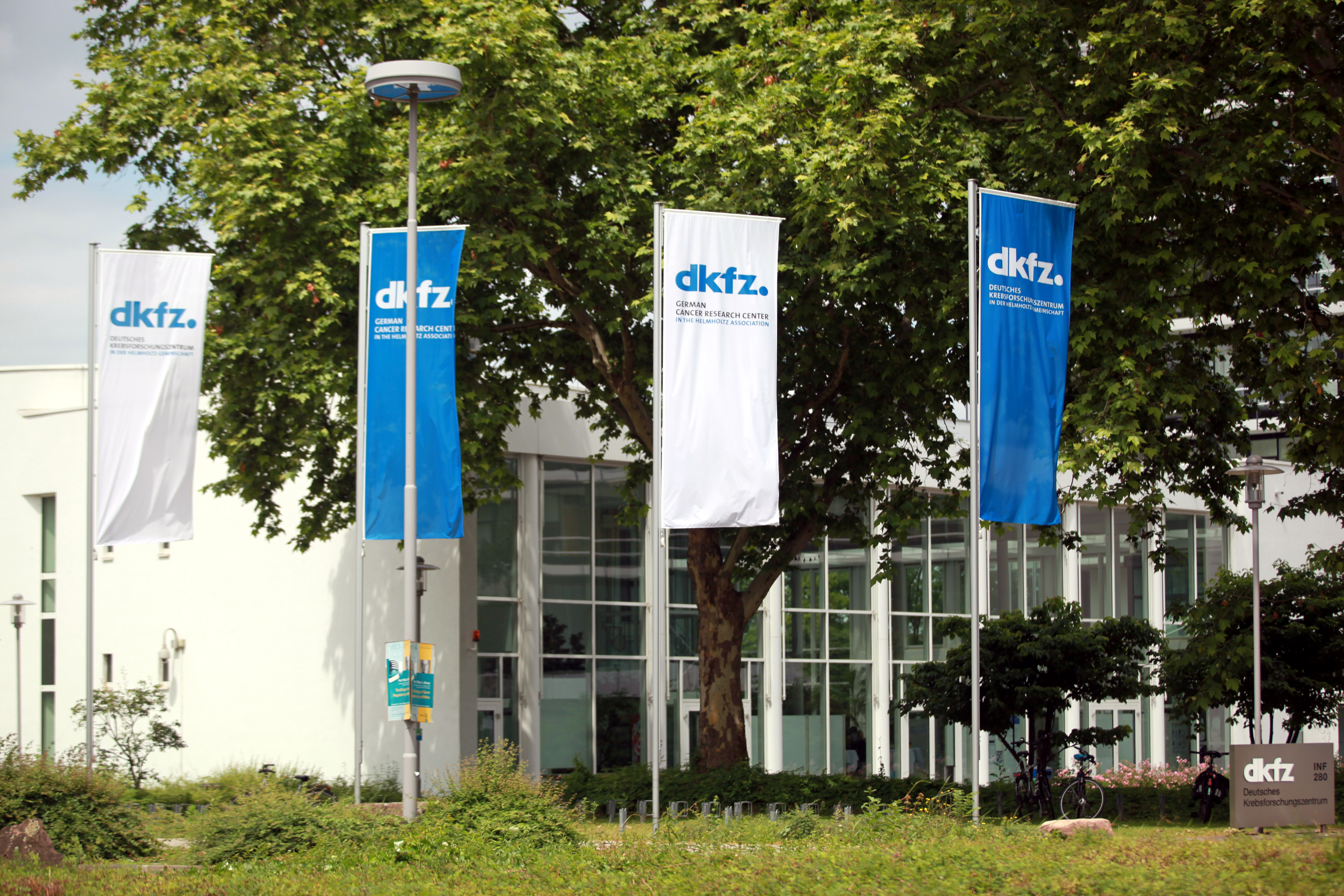
- The information center of the DKFZ, Im Neuenheimer Feld 280, near the headquarters
- Parent institution: Helmholtz Association
- Location: Heidelberg, Germany
- Website: www.dkfz.de/en/index.html

The German Cancer Research Center (known as the Deutsches Krebsforschungszentrum or simply DKFZ in German) is a national cancer research center based in Heidelberg, Germany. It is a member of the Helmholtz Association of German Research Centres, the largest scientific organization in Germany.

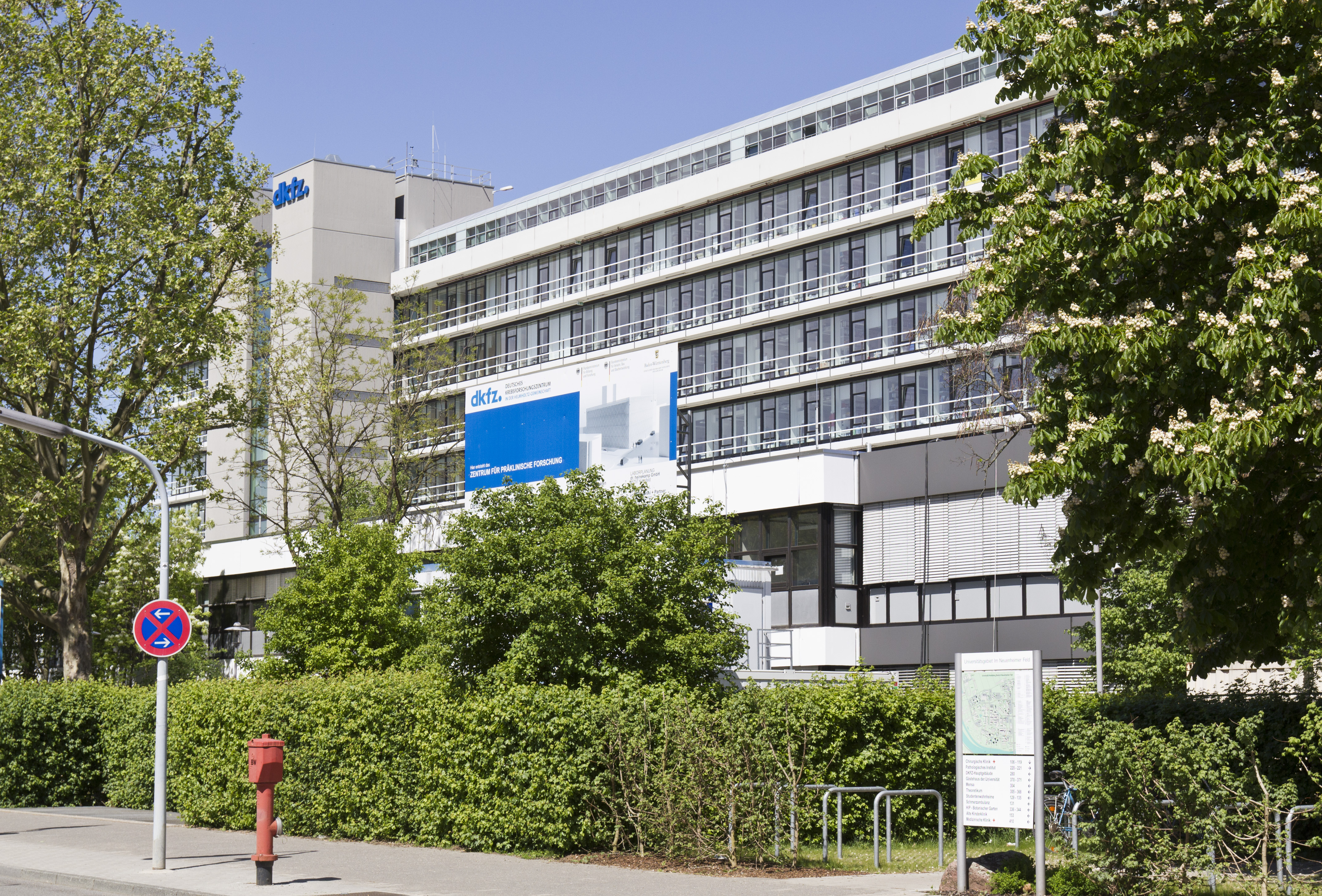
Main building

== History ==
The establishment of a national cancer research center in Germany was initiated by Heidelberg surgeon Karl Heinrich Bauer. The DKFZ was set up in 1964 by resolution of the State government of Baden-Württemberg as a foundation under public law. In 1975, the Center became a member of the Association of National Research Centers ("Arbeitsgemeinschaft der Großforschungseinrichtungen") which was transformed into the Hermann von Helmholtz Association of National Research Centers in 1995. The Center has also been a member of the Deutsche Forschungsgemeinschaft (DFG) since 1977.

Two scientists to date that were affiliated with the DKFZ have received Nobel Prizes. The first was Harald zur Hausen who won the 2008 Nobel Prize in Medicine for his work in the discovery of the human papillomavirus, which causes cervical cancer. The second was Stefan Hell, who won the Nobel Prize in Chemistry for his pioneering work in the field of ultra high resolution fluorescence microscopy.

== Research ==
Cancer research at DKFZ is structured in six Research Programs (as of 2022)

- Cell Biology and Tumor Biology
- Functional and Structural Genomics
- Cancer Risk Factors and Prevention
- Immunology and Cancer
- Imaging and Radiooncology
- Infection, Inflammation and Cancer

DKFZ maintains an interdisciplinary structured graduate school known as the Helmholtz International Graduate School for Cancer Research. The school offers an in-house international M.Sc. program in "Molecular Biosciences" with a major in "Cancer Biology". As well as international Ph.D. program, postdoctoral fellowships and a clinician scientist program.

== Cooperation with other partners ==
A result of the successful cooperation of the German Cancer Research Center with other partners is the first new building for "The National Center for Tumor Diseases" (NCT) in Heidelberg. The project was commissioned by the German Cancer Aid with 29 Million Euro, as it was officially announced at the opening celebration on 2 November 2010, with Germany's Minister of Health, Philipp Roesler (Berlin). The modern new building is located on the campus of Heidelberg University Hospitals. The NCT is a joint project of Heidelberg University Hospitals, Thorax Clinic Heidelberg, the German Cancer Research Center (Deutsches Krebsforschungszentrum, DKFZ) and the German Cancer Aid, founded by the late "First Lady", Mildred Scheel. "NCT's new building offers ideal conditions for translating current research results into clinical practice," said Otmar Wiestler, DKFZ's Scientific Director, at the opening. "Its two strong partners, the German Cancer Research Center and Heidelberg University Hospitals, provide the best basis for this."

The German Cancer Consortium (DKTK) is a joint long-term initiative involving the German Federal Ministry of Education and Research (BMBF), participating in German states and the German Cancer Research Center (DKFZ). It was established as one of six German Health Research Centers (DZGs) in October 2012. More than 950 researchers work within the DKTK, along with support staff. Around 350 of them are employed via the DKFZ. An important task of the DKTK is promoting the next generation of researchers in the field of translational cancer research. For this reason, around 20 percent of all DKTK employees are postgraduate students. The DKTK is financed via an institutional funding model. Since 2014, the DKTK's annual budget has been EUR 27.8 million (90/10 financing). The total budget for the first research period (2012–2015) was EUR 80.5 million.
