= Müttergenesungswerk =

German charity

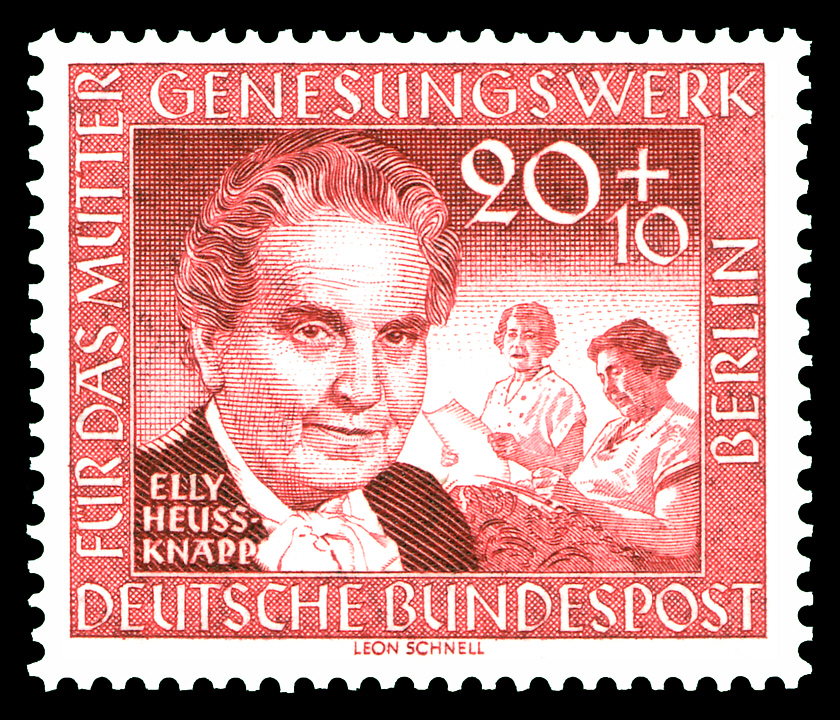
1957 commemorative stamp, Deutsche Bundespost

The Müttergenesungswerk (MGW), full name Elly Heuss-Knapp-Stiftung, Deutsches Müttergenesungswerk, is a charitable organisation founded in 1950 by Elly Heuss-Knapp (1881–1952), then First Lady of Germany as wife of Theodor Heuss. It aims to promote the interests and well-being of mothers by measures of prevention and rehabilitation. The seat of the organisation is in Berlin, and the incumbent First Lady is always its patron, since 2017 Elke Büdenbender.

The foundation offers numerous social facilities for mother-and-child health cures and counselling centres, run by supporting organisations like the German Red Cross, Diakonie and Caritas. The costs of medical indicated treatment are covered by the German health care.
