= Wilhelmine Lübke =

Wife of Federal Republic of Germany President Heinrich Lübke

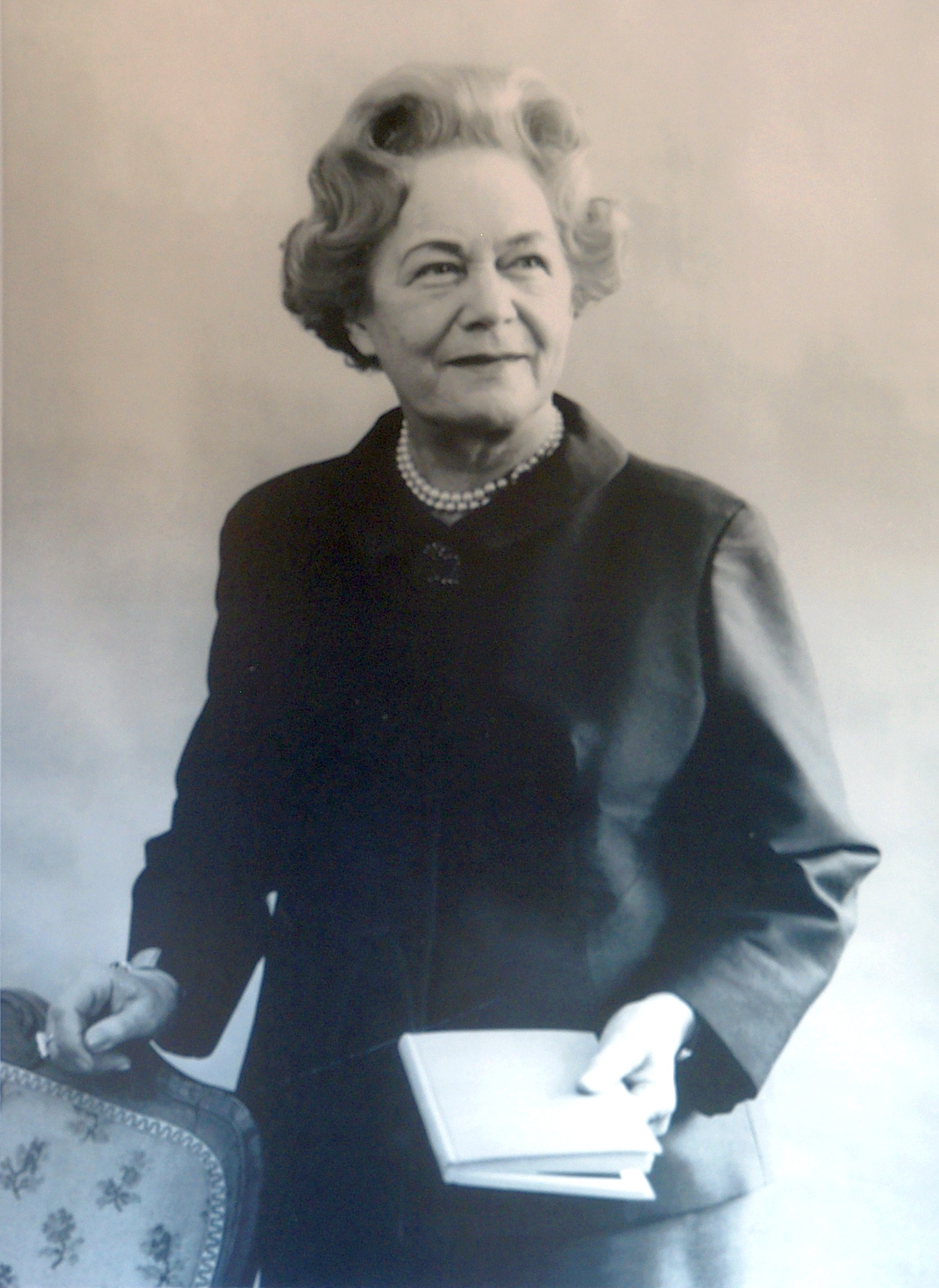
- Born: Wilhelmine Keuthen; 9 May 1885; Ramsbeck, German Empire
- Died: 3 May 1981 (aged 95); Bonn, West Germany
- Education: University of Münster
- Spouse: Heinrich Lübke, President of the Federal Republic of Germany
- Awards: Order of Merit of the Federal Republic of Germany

Wilhelmine Lübke (née Keuthen; 9 May 1885 – 3 May 1981) was the wife of Heinrich Lübke. When he became President of the Federal Republic of Germany in 1959, she represented the country internationally. She founded the Kuratorium Deutsche Altershilfe and was president of the Müttergenesungswerk. The Wilhelmine-Lübke-Preis is named after her.

== Biography ==
Born Wilhelmine Keuthen in Ramsbeck, Sauerland, she was a teacher at a village school. She studied mathematics, German, and philosophy at the Westfälische Wilhelms-Universität in Münster from 1911. She then taught as a Studienrätin at the Franziskus-Oberlyceum in Berlin-Schöneberg from 1914. She met Heinrich Lübke in Berlin in 1922, and they married. She was nine years his senior, and the couple had no children.

She was fluent in English, French, Spanish, Italian, and Russian, in contrast to her husband who had difficulties with foreign languages. In 1953, his career took him to Bonn, then the provisional capital, where the family moved. He became Federal Minister of Food and Agriculture (Ernährungsminister), and was elected President of the Federal Republic of Germany (Bundespräsident) in 1959. She has been regarded as the driving force (treibende Kraft) for him, especially when his health declined.

=== Social projects ===
Wilhelmine Lübke's focus as "First Lady" of the Bundesrepublik was on social projects. With her husband, she founded in 1984 the Kuratorium Deutsche Altershilfe, which developed into the Wilhelmine-Lübke-Stiftung (Wilhelmine Lübke Foundation), issuing the Wilhelmine-Lübke-Preis, a prize named after her. She developed ideas such as Essen auf Rädern (Meals on Wheels) and care of senior citizens for a day or a short time (Kurzzeitpflege).

During her husband's time in office, she was president of the Müttergenesungswerk, which her predecessor Elly Heuss-Knapp had founded in 1952. All later First Ladies automatically held this position. She participated in Aktion Gemeinsinn and UNICEF. She said that whoever takes care of others has no time to be old ("Wer sich um andere kümmert, hat keine Zeit, alt zu sein.")

=== State visits ===
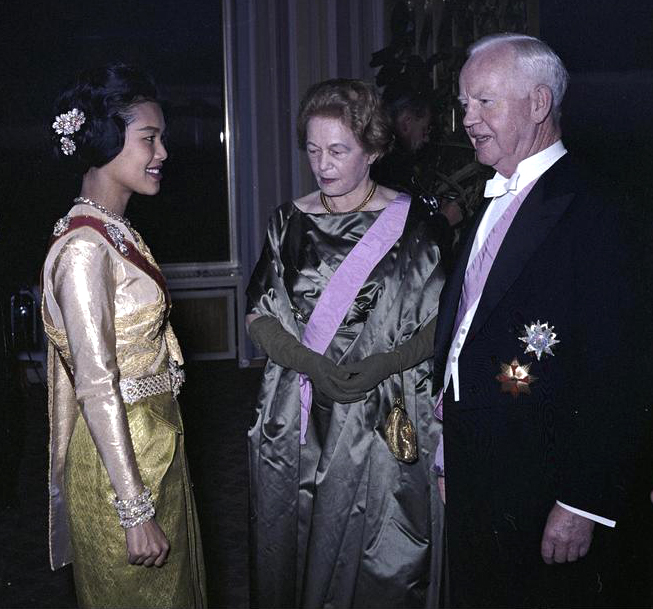
Wilhelmine and Heinrich Lübke with Queen Sirikit of Thailand

The president and his wife cherished state visits in both directions as a means of Kulturdiplomatie (cultural diplomacy). She joined him on more than 50 visits in Europe, Africa, Asia, and Latin America. While Lübke was president, several venues were established to house and meet foreign visitors, including the Petersberg, Schloss Augustusburg in Brühl and the Redoute in Bad Gosdesberg. They received King Bhumibol and Queen Sirikit of Thailand in 1959. The reception of Queen Elizabeth II took place in Augustusburg in 1964.

=== Later years ===
After her husband's tenure, which ended in 1969, Wilhelmine Lübke remained a focal point in Bonn's society, receiving many guests privately. After her husband's death in 1972, she attended the state act and the Requiem at the Cologne Cathedral on 13 April 1972. She initiated a museum in his memory, founded in 1975 at his birthplace in Sundern-Enkhausen, the Heinrich-Lübke-Haus, which also remembers her achievements. Wilhelmine Lübke died in Bonn and was buried next to her husband in Enkhausen.

== Honours ==
=== National honours ===
- West Germany:
  - Grand Cross 1st Class of the Order of Merit of the Federal Republic of West Germany

=== Foreign honours ===
- Cameroon:
  - Grand Cross of the Order of Valour
- Japan
  - Grand Cordon of the Order of the Precious
- Malaysia:
  - Honorary Recipient of the Most Exalted Order of the Crown of the Realm
- Philippines:
  - Grand Collar of the Order of the Golden Heart
- Thailand:
  - Dame Grand Cross of the Order of Chula Chom Klao

Unofficial roles
Vacant Title last held by Elly Heuss-Knapp	Spouse of the President of West Germany; 1959–1969	Succeeded by Hilda Heinemann
