= Bovine Meat and Milk Factors =

DNA molecules linked to cancer

Bovine Meat and Milk Factors (BMMFs) are circular, single-stranded DNA molecules (cssDNAs), also termed plasmid-like, originally found in beef and cow's milk which have been linked to the development of cancer—particularly colorectal and breast cancer. They are formerly known as Slow Progressive Hidden INfections of variable X (SPHINX). Similar molecules have since been found in a much wider range of food. In 2022, a study examined whether BMMF occurred in foods that were not of taurine bovine origin. Numerous foods including chicken, pork, seafood, fruit, vegetables and grains were examined using PCR analysis. BMMF/SPHINX-like DNA was identified in plants, poultry, wild animals and seafood.

BMMF/SPHINX sequences are able to copy themselves in animal cells. They encode functional proteins that are expressed in some animal cells. Every BMMF/SPHINX contains at least a "Rep" open reading frame, which encodes a replication endonuclease that, in HEK 293TT cells, acts to replicate and retain the cssDNA. The cssDNA derive from bacteria in an outer membrane vesicle OMV and in vitro cross into human tissue culture cells, demonstrating the role of OMV in transport from bacterial to eucaryotic cells.

BMMF/SPHINX sequences are divided into four clades. Clades 1, 2, and 3 share sequence similarity with the plasmids of Acinetobacter baumannii. (A. baumanii regularly produces outer membrane vesicles containing these plasmids, and animal cells are known to take up these vesicles.) Clade 4 shares sequence similarity with Gemycircularvirus.

== Health research ==
The potential connection between BMMFs and cancer has been made based on assessments of epidemiological data and the investigation of antibodies in human serum. Epidemiological studies revealed differences involving consumption of red meat originating from different species of cattle, e.g., Eurasian dairy cattle versus Zebu and Yak breeds. Consumers of red meat mostly from Eurasian dairy cattle origins revealed high incidences of breast and colon cancers.

Research has also suggested a potential link between BMMFs and neurodegenerative diseases such as multiple sclerosis.

At the end of 2017, evidence was presented that BMMFs in human cells show long-term survival, through the identification of BMMFs' RNA and protein products. In February 2019, evidence was presented of a previously unknown infectious agent in the blood serum and milk of Eurasian cattle that could indirectly trigger the development of colorectal cancer. In 2022, the Max-Ruber Institut and the German Federal Institute for Risk Assessment published the opinion that the hypothesis that BMMF represent “novel pathogens” that only occur in European cattle and the foods derived from them should be revised.

Given the preponderance of milk and red meat in a human diet, research is directed toward understanding why these cancers are relatively less common in other species. One hypothesis is that human milk contains the sugar, N-acetylneuraminic acid (Neu-5Ac) which is converted to N-glycolneuraminic acid (Neu-5Gc), of which the latter sugar binds and blocks some receptors on cell surfaces. Cattle, mice and some other mammals produce Neu5Gc endogenously and thus are likely immune tolerant. The BMMF infections then do not induce chronic inflammation as it does in humans.

=== Abandoned theories ===
For a short period the SPHINX DNAs were believed to have some connection with transmissible spongiform encephalopathy following its isolation from CJD and scrapies patients. The author of the article has since moved on to a viral hypothesis for TSE.
