= Theodor-Heuss-Gymnasium Heilbronn =

School in Heilbronn, Germany

Coordinates: 49.142639°N 9.226806°E

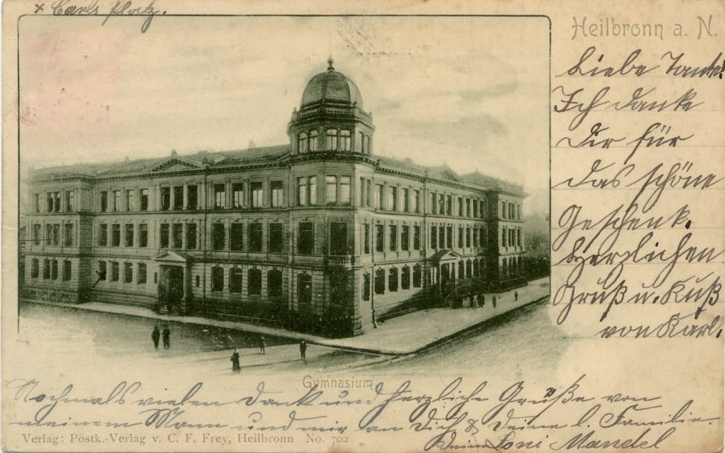
The pre-war school building in 1902

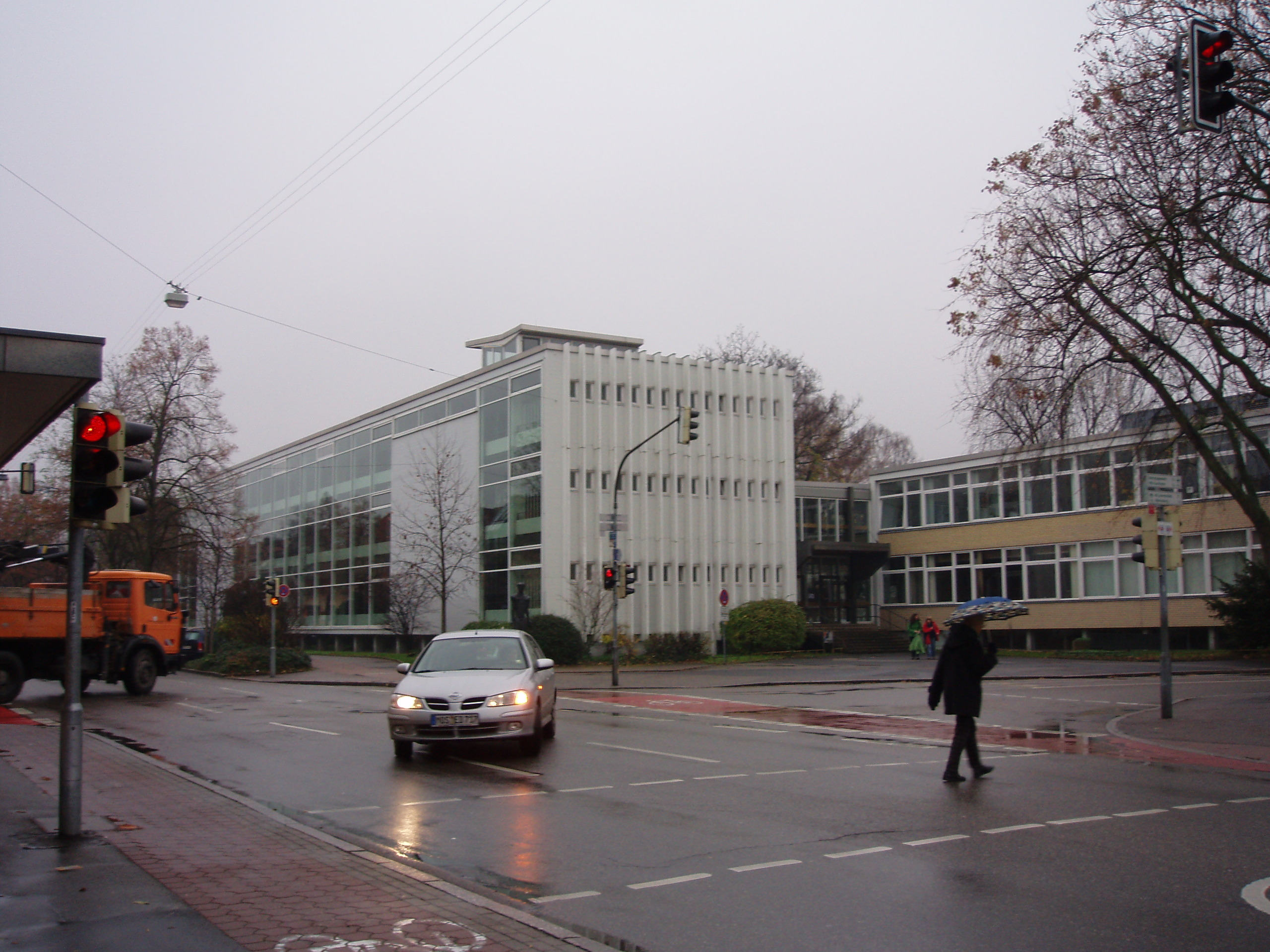
The post-war school building in 2006

The Theodor-Heuss-Gymnasium Heilbronn is a Gymnasium in the city of Heilbronn. The roots of school date from a Lateinschule (Latin school) of the 15th century. In 1620, the school was converted into a Gymnasium. From 1827 to 1938, it was named the Karlsgymnasium. In 1880 the school moved into a new building that had been built in 1878 on the Karlstraße, where the current school is located. In 1938 the Karlsgymnasium was temporarily merged with a boys' middle school and renamed the Karlsoberschule. During World War II, an Allied air raid on December 4, 1944, destroyed the school building, which was then used as a hospital for wounded people. All teaching aids and most of the historical library that was not outsourced were consumed by the flames. Since 1950, it has been named after its most famous pupil, Theodor Heuss, the first President of the Federal Republic of Germany. Today's school building, built between 1956 and 1958, is a listed cultural monument.

== Sources ==
- Friedrich Pressel: Heilbronn und sein Gymnasium (Beitrag von 1900). In: Aus der Heilbronner Stadtgeschichte. Historischer Verein Heilbronn, Heilbronn 1988
- Ernst Roller: Musikpflege und Musikerziehung in der Reichsstadt Heilbronn. Stadtarchiv Heilbronn, Heilbronn 1970 (Kleine Schriftenreihe des Archivs der Stadt Heilbronn. Band 1)
- Alfred Kolbeck (Bearb.): 350 Jahre Gymnasium in Heilbronn. Festschrift zum Jubiläum des Theodor-Heuss-Gymnasiums. Stadtarchiv Heilbronn, Heilbronn 1971 (Veröffentlichungen des Archivs der Stadt Heilbronn. Band 17)
