= Heinrich Lübke =

President of West Germany from 1959 to 1969

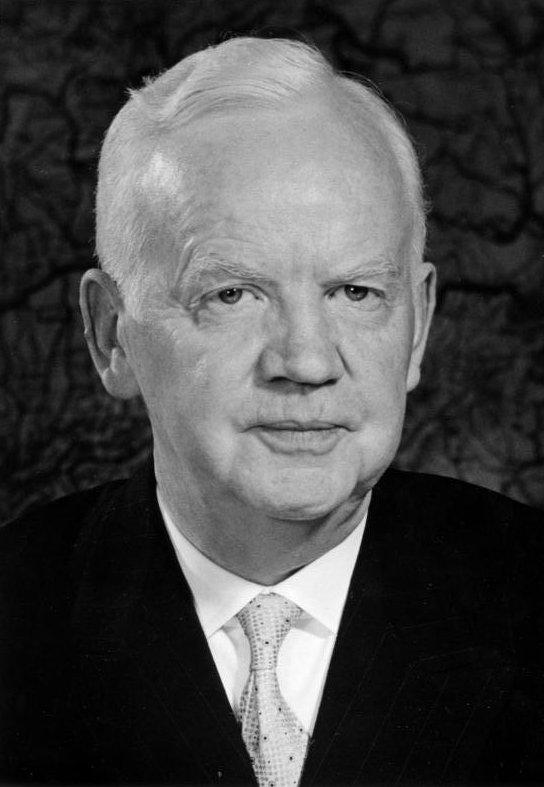
- Lübke in 1959

President of Germany (Note: Due to the division of Germany, Heinrich Lübke was only the President of West Germany. The term West Germany is the common English name for the Federal Republic of Germany between its formation on 23 May 1949 and the German reunification through the accession of East Germany on 3 October 1990.)
- In office 13 September 1959 – 30 June 1969
- Chancellor: Konrad Adenauer; Ludwig Erhard; Kurt Georg Kiesinger
- Preceded by: Theodor Heuss
- Succeeded by: Gustav Heinemann

Federal Minister of Food, Agriculture and Forestry
- In office 20 October 1953 – 15 September 1959
- Chancellor: Konrad Adenauer
- Preceded by: Wilhelm Niklas
- Succeeded by: Werner Schwarz

Member of the Bundestag
- In office 6 September 1953 – 2 September 1959
- Preceded by: Franz Etzel
- Succeeded by: Arnold Verhoeven
- Constituency: Rees – Dinslaken
- In office 14 August 1949 – 19 November 1950
- Preceded by: Constituency created
- Succeeded by: Ernst Majonica
- Constituency: Arnsberg – Soest

Minister for Food, Agriculture and Forests of the State of North Rhine-Westphalia
- In office 6 January 1947 – 1 January 1953
- Preceded by: Hermann Heukamp
- Succeeded by: Johannes Peters

Member of the Landtag of North Rhine-Westphalia
- In office 1946 – 6 March 1954

Member of the Landtag of Prussia
- In office 1932–1933

Personal details
- Born: Karl Heinrich Lübke; 14 October 1894 Enkhausen, Germany
- Died: 6 April 1972 (aged 77) Bonn, West Germany
- Party: Centre Party (Zentrumspartei) (1930–1933); Christian Democratic Union (1945–1972)
- Spouse: Wilhelmine Keuthen (m. 1929)

Military service
- Allegiance: German Empire (1914–1918); Weimar Republic (1918); Nazi Germany
- Branch/service: Imperial German Army; German Army
- Rank: Captain in the reserve
- Battles/wars: World War I

Karl Heinrich Lübke (German: [ˈhaɪnʁɪç ˈlʏpkə]; 14 October 1894 – 6 April 1972) was a German politician, who served as president of West Germany from 1959 to 1969.

He suffered from deteriorating health towards the end of his career and is known for a series of embarrassing incidents that may have resulted from his health issues. Lübke resigned three months before the scheduled end of his second term amid a scandal as to his involvement with the Nazi regime during World War II.

== Early life ==
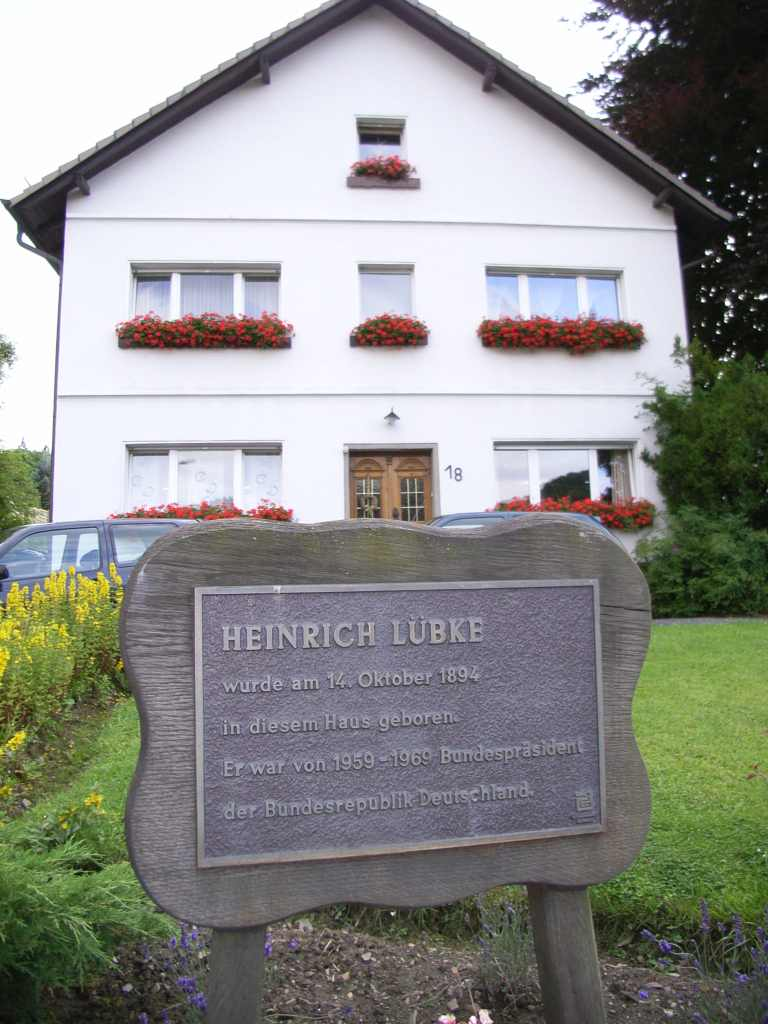
Lübke's birthplace in Enkhausen with a memorial plaque, 2008

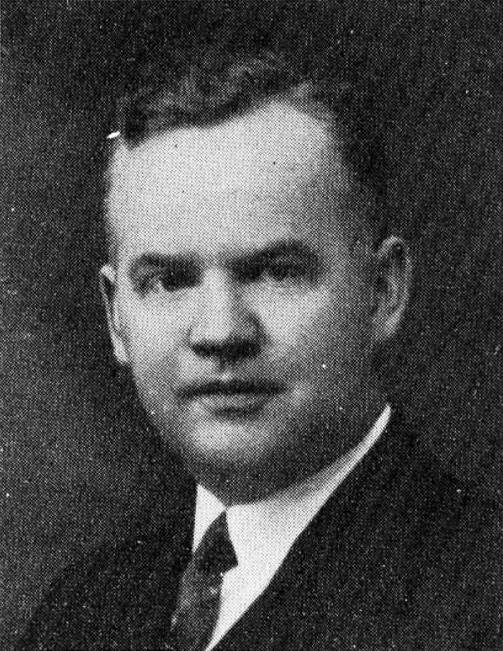
Lübke's official Landtag portrait, 1932

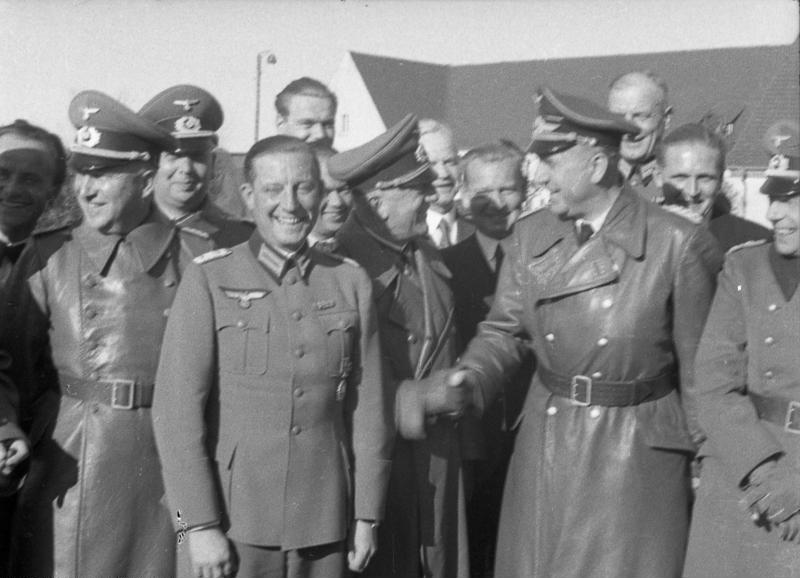
Lübke (center, back) at Peenemünde in 1941

Born in Enkhausen, Westphalia, Lübke had a very humble upbringing. He was the son of a shoemaker and farmer from the Sauerland, and was a surveyor by training. He volunteered for service in World War I in August 1914. He completed his basic training first with the Westphalian Foot Artillery Regiment No.7, with which he was then deployed on the Eastern and Western Fronts. In 1916, he was promoted to Vizefeldwebel. After a gas attack, he was taken to a field hospital. In 1917, he was promoted to lieutenant and became deputy battery chief in the 52nd Reserve Division. He then became an orderly officer and was involved in the Battle of Passchendaele. Before the end of the war, he was transferred to the GHQ of the Supreme Army Command. During the war, he received the Iron Cross 1st and 2nd class. He was discharged from military service in December 1918.

Lübke resumed his studies and received an examination as a surveying and cultural engineer in 1921. During his studies in Bonn, he joined the student association K.D.St.V. Ascania Bonn in the Cartellverband. From 1921 to 1924, he studied economics in Münster and Berlin. From 1921 to 1922, he was employed by the Westphalia tenants and settlers association in Münster. From October 1922, he was managing director of the Reich Association of Small Agricultural Enterprises (from 1925 also medium-sized enterprises). After 1924, he was also a member of the executive committee of the Deutscher Bund für Bodenreform. In 1926, he became managing director of the Deutsche Bauernschaft. From 1927, he was also the managing director of the Bauernland AG settlement company.

In 1929, Lübke married Wilhelmine Keuthen (1885–1981) in Berlin-Wilmersdorf.

In 1930, he became a member of the Roman Catholic Centre Party (Zentrumspartei) and in April 1932 was elected as a member of the Prussian Parliament. From 1932 to 1933, Lübke was a member of the Prussian state parliament for the German Center Party. He was re-elected in the state elections on 5 March 1933. On 18 May 1933, as in the Reich, the state parliament approved an enabling law for Prussia against the votes of the SPD. After that, it never met again. On 14 October 1933, the representative bodies of the federal states were dissolved and finally repealed without replacement on 30 January 1934.

After the seizure of power by the National Socialists in 1933 and the subsequent dissolution of the Zentrumspartei, Lübke was accused of misappropriating public funds and imprisoned; after 20 months in prison, he was released, when no evidence could be produced to back up the politically motivated charges. It was not until 1937 that he was able to get a senior position with a building society (German: Wohnungsbaugesellschaft). In 1939, just before the outbreak of World War II, he moved to a company of building engineers managed by the architect Walter Schlempp. Here he came to the notice of Albert Speer and was given responsibility for major building projects, some of which were under the aegis of the Armaments Ministry run by Speer. One of these was the extension of the "Army Research Center Peenemünde" (Heeresversuchsanstalt Peenemünde in German, abbreviated HVP) and the "Air Force Test Centre"(Erprobungsstelle der Luftwaffe in German), Peenemünde-West. In February 1945, Lübke was charged by Speer with setting up a "post-war office for planning prefabricated housing" alongside architect Rudolf Wolters.

He performed three military exercises in the Wehrmacht as a reserve officer and was promoted to first lieutenant in the reserve. In 1942, he was promoted to captain of the reserve.

== Post-war political career ==
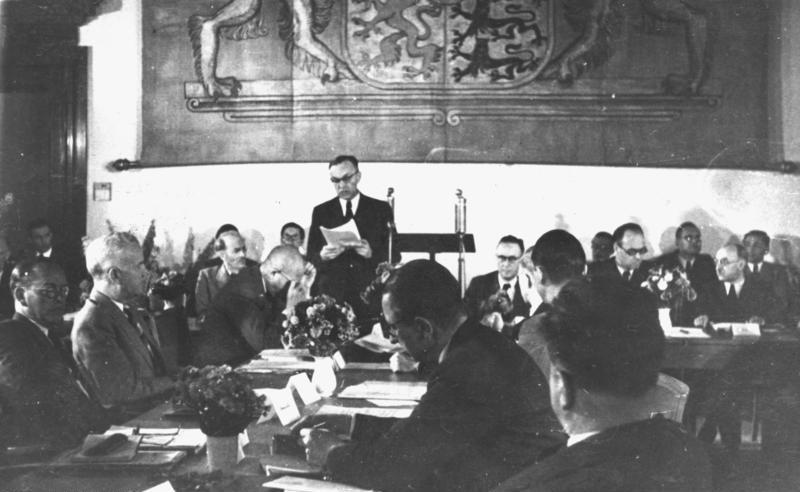
Lübke (seated at table, second from the left) at the Minister president meeting in Munich, 1947

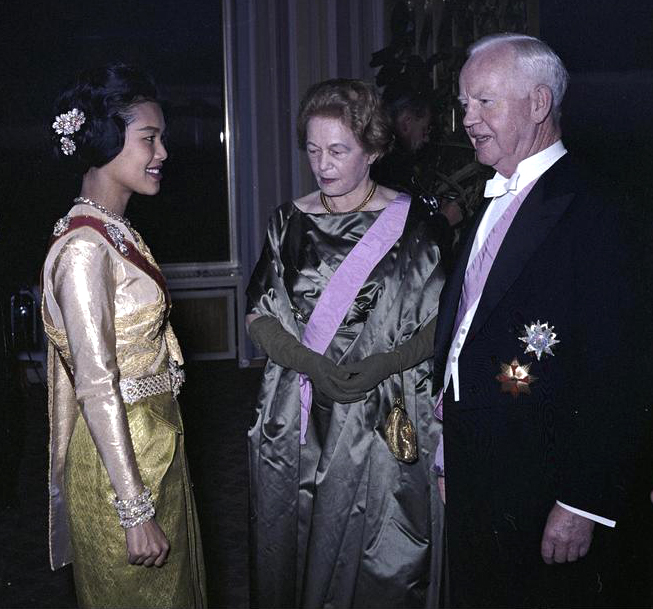
Heinrich and Wilhelmine Lübke with Queen Sirikit of Thailand in 1960

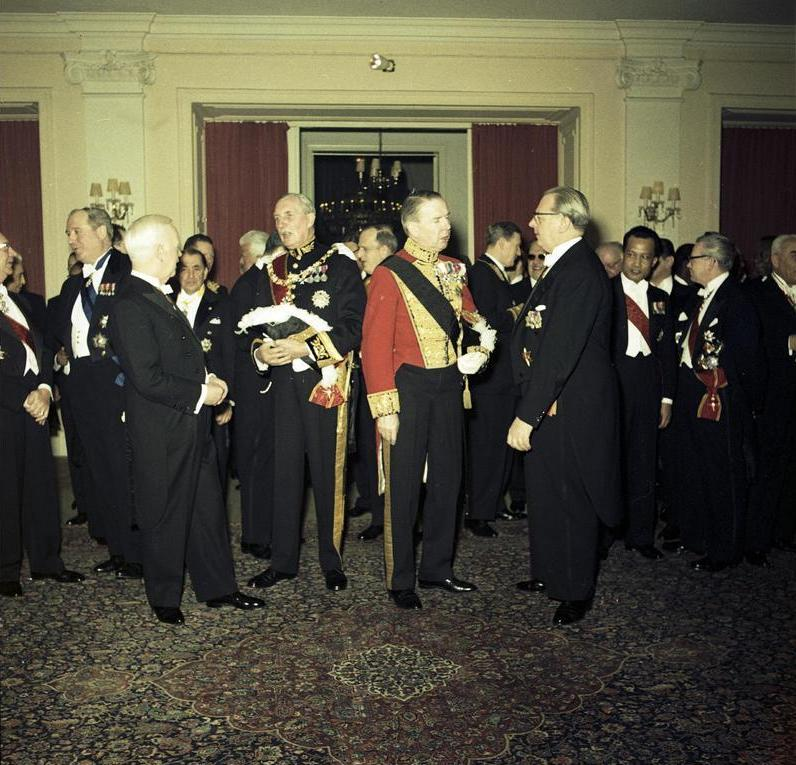
Lübke at a diplomatic reception in Bonn, 1961

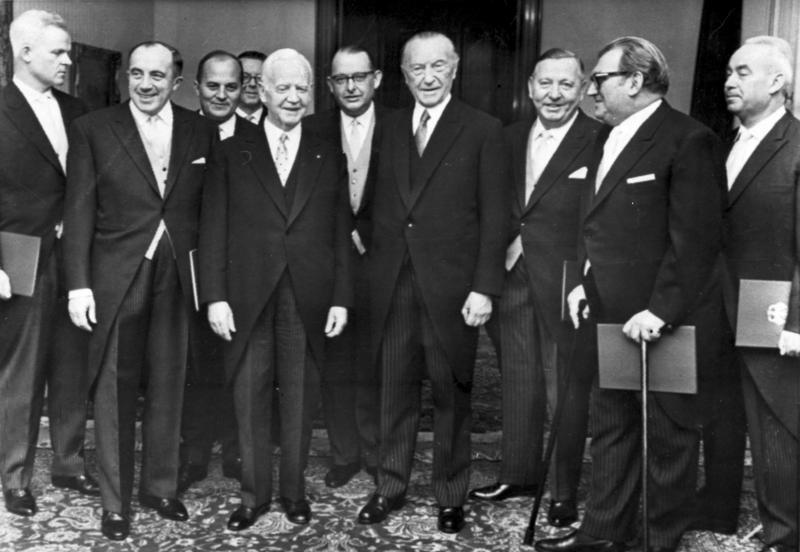
Lübke with fifth Adenauer cabinet in 1961

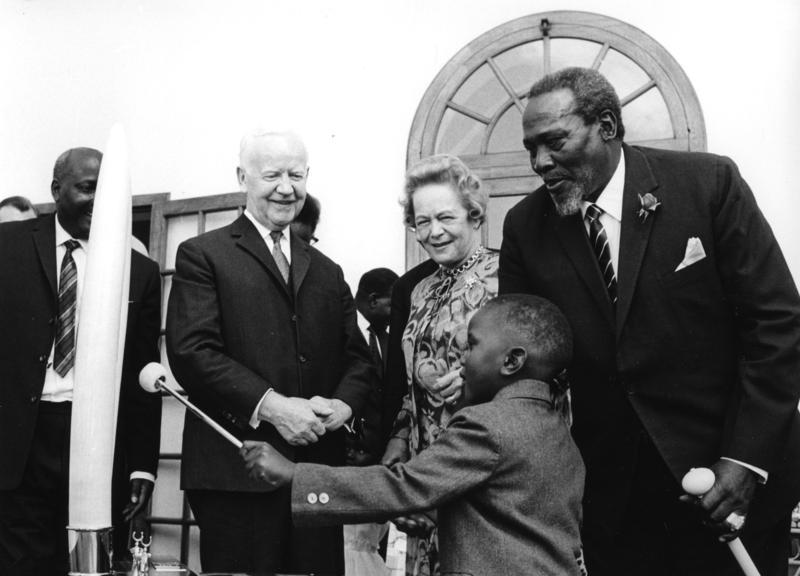
Lübke with President of Kenya Jomo Kenyatta and his son Uhuru in 1966

After the war, Lübke returned to his career in politics, becoming a member of the West German CDU party and was appointed Minister of Agriculture in the state parliament of North Rhine-Westphalia in 1947. In 1953, Konrad Adenauer appointed him to his cabinet as Federal Minister of Agriculture in Bonn.

Lübke was chosen by Adenauer as a candidate for the largely ceremonial post of president to ensure that Adenauer's political schemes were not disturbed by too strong a personality in this position, which is nominally the highest post in the German state. Lübke defeated Carlo Schmid, the SPD candidate, and Max Becker, the FDP candidate for the presidency, in the second round of voting in 1959.

On 29 June 1964, at a press conference in Berlin, Prof. Albert Norden, one of GDR's chief Communist propagandists, alleged that Lübke acted as an informer for the Gestapo (secret police) during the war and at the very least he had been aware of the use of slave labour on his projects; building plans bearing his signature and containing concentration camp barrack blocks were advanced as evidence of his complicity, but these were dismissed in the West as East German and Eastern Bloc propaganda.

On 1 July 1964, he was re-elected by the Fourth Federal Convention. The re-election was preceded by a meeting between Lübke and Herbert Wehner (SPD) during a cure in Bad Kissingen, at which both agreed on re-election and spoke out in favour of a grand coalition. Only then did Lübke inform the CDU and he was confirmed in office with the votes of both major parties. The State Secretary in the Office of the Federal President, Hans von Herwarth, who had internally opposed a second term in office because of Lübke's state of health, was subsequently replaced and sent to Rome as ambassador. Lübke campaigned for the formation of the Grand Coalition (Kiesinger cabinet).

Lubke stated in Berlin on 19 July 1964, "Our young people must learn more about the devotion and the willingness to sacrifice themselves that marked the men and women who rose against Hitler."

In September 1966, Lübke's office claimed that the document with his signature on display in Munich was a "forgery" and was Communist inspired. The document contained a directive for the construction of a wartime concentration camp.

The historian Tony Judt has observed that Lübke's presidency, like the chancellorship of Kurt Georg Kiesinger, showed the "a glaring contradiction in the Bonn Republic's self-image" in view of their previous Nazi allegiances. Lübke's status as a one-time political prisoner under the National Socialists placed him in good stead. Nevertheless, the potential scandal threatened to damage the office of the president; on 14 October 1968, Lübke announced that he would resign on 30 June 1969, his resignation taking effect three months before the scheduled end of his term of office.

The former president's health deteriorated. His intention to live in West Berlin from time to time could not be realised, nor could he, with his private library of about 5,000 books, pursue his scientific hobbies in comparative linguistics and microbiology.

Lübke's political friends ignored him, if they did not avoid him. His successor in the presidency, Gustav Heinemann, however, kept in contact with him. Trips to Tenerife, in autumn 1969 and at Christmas in 1970 and 1971, brought no improvement in his condition. Arteriosclerosis of the arteries in both his brain and his limbs was becoming increasingly noticeable, leading to serious speech disorders, declining physical mobility, and progressive memory loss. In retrospect, it was clear that this disease had started several years earlier and explained many aspects of the West German president's behaviour during his last years in office. In November 1971, the former president visited his birthplace in Enkhausen for the last time.

On 30 March 1972, an acute stomach hemorrhage required an emergency operation during which it was discovered that he was suffering from a very advanced form of stomach cancer which had already spread to his brain. After two more haemorrhages, Lübke died on 6 April 1972 at the age of 77 in the West German capital of Bonn.

== As a speaker ==
Lübke was a poor public speaker and was frequently subject to ridicule, especially near the end of his term of office when his age and his failing health started to affect his memory and general cognitive abilities. He frequently forgot where he was (Lübke: "When I talk to you today in...eh... in.." Voice from the crowd shouting: "Helmstedt!" Lübke: "...eh...when I talk to you today in ... Helmstedt, then it was following my own will...", etc.). This was further ridiculed in the German translation of Danger Mouse, where Penfold is called "Lübke" and is frequently ordered to "shut up" ("Lübke, Schnauze!").

Various other slips are well documented, such as the address in Antananarivo, Madagascar: "My very dear Mr. President, dear Mrs. Tananarive..." His word-for-word translations of German into English (see Lübke English) were also the subject of much mockery.

Tapes from Lübke's speeches were collected by the German satirical magazine Pardon and distributed on a best-selling record.

== Honours ==
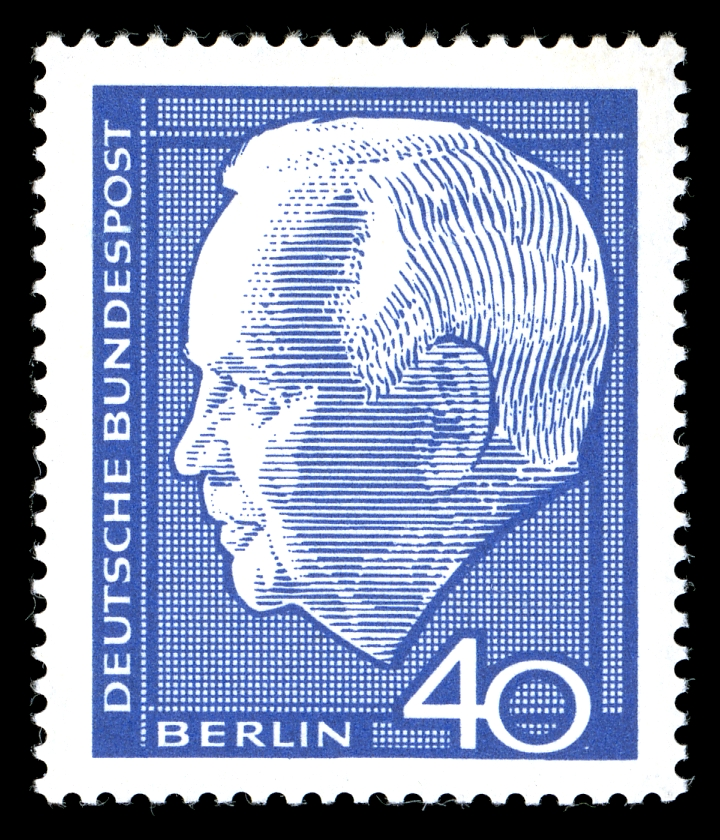
Definitive stamp during his term (1964)

=== National honour ===
- West Germany:
  - Grand Cross Special Class (and former Grand Master) of the Order of Merit of the Federal Republic of West Germany

=== Foreign honours ===
- Cameroon:
  - Grand Cordon of the Order of Valour
- Ethiopia:
  - Knight of the Order of Solomon
- France:
  - Grand Cross of the Order of the Legion of Honour
- Indonesia:
  - Star of the Republic of Indonesia, 1st Class
- Iran:
  - First Class with Collar of the Order of Pahlavi
- Malaysia:
  - Honorary Recipient of the Most Exalted Order of the Crown of the Realm
- Philippines:
  - Grand Collar (Raja) of the Order of Sikatuna
- Somalia:
  - Order of the Somali Star
- South Korea:
  - Grand Order of Mugunghwa
- Thailand:
  - Knight of the Order of the Rajamitrabhorn
  - Knight Grand Cordon (Special Class) of the Order of Chula Chom Klao
- United Kingdom:
  - Honorary Knight Grand Cross of the Order of the Bath

== Notes ==
Political offices
Preceded by Theodor Heuss	President of West Germany; 1959–1969	Succeeded by Gustav Heinemann
