= Harald zur Hausen =

German virologist (1936–2023)

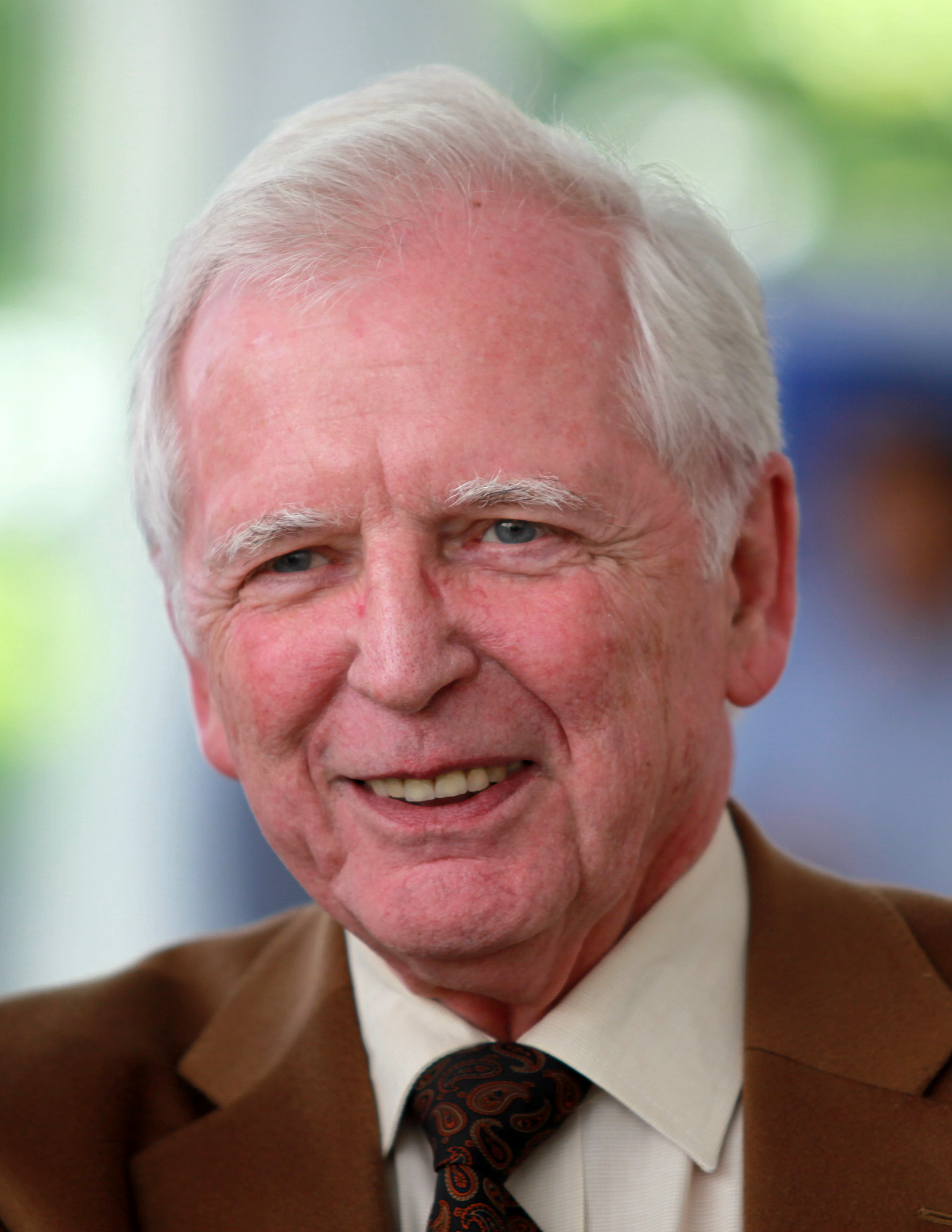
- zur Hausen in 2010
- Born: 11 March 1936; Gelsenkirchen, Gau Westphalia-North, Germany
- Died: 29 May 2023 (aged 87); Heidelberg, Baden-Württemberg, Germany
- Known for: Discovery that HPV can cause cervical cancer
- Spouse: Ethel-Michele de Villiers (m. 1993)
- Awards: Ernst Jung Prize (1996); Prince Mahidol Award (2005); Nobel Prize in Physiology or Medicine (2008)
- Scientific career
- Fields: Virology
- Institutions: German Cancer Research Center University of Heidelberg

Harald zur Hausen NAS EASA APS (German pronunciation: [ˈhaʁalt tsuːɐ̯ ˈhaʊzn̩]; 11 March 1936 – 29 May 2023) was a German virologist. He carried out research on cervical cancer and discovered the role of papilloma viruses in cervical cancer, for which he received the Nobel Prize in Physiology or Medicine in 2008. He was chairman of the German Cancer Research Center (Deutsches Krebsforschungszentrum, DKFZ) in Heidelberg.

== Early life and education ==
Zur Hausen was born in Gelsenkirchen in a Catholic family. He completed his Abitur at Antonianum Grammar School in Vechta, then studied medicine at the universities of Bonn from 1955, Hamburg from 1957, and Düsseldorf from 1958, and received a Doctor of Medicine degree there in 1960. He pursued internships in Wimbern, Isny, Gelsenkirchen, and Düsseldorf, qualifying as a physician in 1962.

== Career ==
He joined the Institute for Microbiology at the University of Düsseldorf as a laboratory assistant in 1962. After three and a half years there, he moved to Philadelphia to work at the Virus Laboratories of Children's Hospital of Philadelphia together with eminent virologists Werner and Gertrude Henle, who had escaped from Nazi Germany. In 1967, he contributed to a ground-breaking study that for the first time proved a virus (Epstein–Barr virus) can turn healthy cells (lymphocytes) into cancer cells. He became an assistant professor at the University of Pennsylvania in 1968. In 1969, he returned to Germany to become a regular teaching and researching professor at the University of Würzburg's Institute for Virology. In 1972, he moved to the University of Erlangen–Nuremberg. In 1977, he moved on to the University of Freiburg (Breisgau), where he headed the Department of Virology and Hygiene.

Working with Lutz Gissmann, zur Hausen first isolated human papillomavirus 6 by simple centrifugation from genital warts. He isolated HPV 6 DNA from genital warts, suggesting a possible new way of identifying viruses in human tumours. This discovery paid off several years later, in 1983, when zur Hausen identified HPV 16 DNA in cervical cancer tumours by means of Southern blot hybridization. This was followed by the discovery of HPV18 a year later, thus identifying the causes of approximately 75% of human cervical cancer. The announcement of his breakthrough sparked a major scientific controversy.

From 1983 until 2003, zur Hausen served as chairman of the board and scientific advisory board member of the German Cancer Research Center (Deutsches Krebsforschungszentrum, DKFZ) in Heidelberg and as professor of medicine at Heidelberg University.

From 2007 to 2011, zur Hausen was a member of the scientific advisory board of Zukunftskolleg at the University of Konstanz. He was editor-in-chief of the International Journal of Cancer until the end of 2010. On 1 January 2010, zur Hausen became the vice president of German Cancer Aid (Deutsche Krebshilfe), the largest cancer charity in Europe.

== Scientific merits ==
Zur Hausen's field of research was the study of oncoviruses. In 1976, he hypothesised that human papillomavirus plays an important role in causing cervical cancer. Together with his collaborators, he then identified HPV16 and HPV18 in cervical cancers in 1983–84. This research made possible the development of the HPV vaccine, the first formulation of which was commercialised in 2006. He is also credited with discovery of the virus causing genital warts (HPV 6) and a monkey lymphotropic polyomavirus that is a close relative to a recently discovered human Merkel cell polyomavirus, as well as of techniques to immortalise cells with Epstein–Barr virus and to induce replication of the virus using phorbol esters. His work on papillomaviruses and cervical cancer received a great deal of scientific criticism when first published but subsequently was confirmed and was used as the basis for research on other high-risk papillomaviruses.

=== Nobel Prize ===
Zur Hausen shared the 2008 Nobel Prize in Medicine with Luc Montagnier and Françoise Barré-Sinoussi, for his discovery of human papilloma virus (HPV) causing cervical cancer

The award of the 2008 Nobel Prize to zur Hausen became controversial following the revelation that Bo Angelin, a member of the Nobel Assembly that year, also sat on the board of AstraZeneca, a company that earns patent royalties for HPV vaccines. The controversy was exacerbated by the fact that AstraZeneca had also entered into a partnership with Nobel Web and Nobel Media to sponsor documentaries and lectures to increase awareness of the prize. However, colleagues widely felt that the award was deserved, and the secretary of the Nobel Committee and Assembly issued a statement affirming that Bo Angelin was unaware of AstraZeneca's HPV vaccine patents at the time of the vote.

== Personal life ==
Zur Hausen had three sons from his first marriage, Jan Dirk, Axel and Gerrit. In 1993, he married Ethel-Michele de Villiers, who at the time was a fellow researcher at the German Cancer Research Center, and who in prior years had co-authored many research journal articles with zur Hausen on papilloma virus and genital cancer, dating as far back as 1981. He acknowledged her research contributions and support in his Nobel Prize biography.

Zur Hausen died on 29 May 2023, at age 87.

== Books ==
- Zur Hausen, Harald (2006). Infections Causing Human Cancer. Weinheim: Wiley-VCH. ISBN 3-527-31056-8. OCLC 160074602.

== Awards ==
- Robert Koch Prize (1975)
- Lila and Murray Gruber Memorial Cancer Research Award from the American Academy of Dermatology (1985)
- Charles S. Mott Prize (1986)
- Paul Ehrlich and Ludwig Darmstaedter Prize (1994)
- International member of the American Philosophical Society (1998)
- Raymond Bourgine Award (2006)
- William B. Coley Award for Distinguished Research in Basic and Tumor Immunology (with Ian Frazer) (2006)
- Loeffler-Frosch Medal of Erlangen(2007)
- Johann-Georg-Zimmermann Medal of Hannover (2007)
- Warren Alpert Foundation Prize (2007)
- AACR Award for Lifetime Achievement in Cancer Research (2008)
- Gairdner Foundation International Award (2008)
- Nobel Prize in Physiology or Medicine (2008)
- Knight Commander's Cross of the Order of Merit of the Federal Republic of Germany (2009)
- Tsungming-Tu Prize (2011)
- Ernst Wertheim Prize (2012)
- Science of Oncology Award from the American Society of Clinical Oncology (2014)
- Mike Price Gold Medal Award from The European Association for Cancer Research (2014)

=== Memberships ===
- Member of the Academia Europaea (1990)
- Member of the American Philosophical Society (1998)
- Honorary Member European Academy of Sciences and Arts (2008)
- International member of the National Academy of Sciences (2009)
- Foreign Member of the Finnish Society of Sciences and Letters (2010)
- Honorary Fellow of the World Hellenic Biomedical Association (2013)
- Fellow of the American Association for Cancer Research (2013)
- Honorary Member of the German Society of Virology (2013)
- Corresponding member of the Slovenian Academy of Sciences and Arts (June 2015)
- Fellow of the American Association for the Advancement of Science (2017)

=== Honorary degrees ===
Zur Hausen received almost 40 honorary doctorates and numerous honorary professorships, including degrees from the universities of Chicago, Umeå, Prague, Salford, Helsinki, Erlangen-Nuremberg, Ferrara, Guadalajara and Sal.
