= Theodor Heuss =

President of West Germany from 1949 to 1959

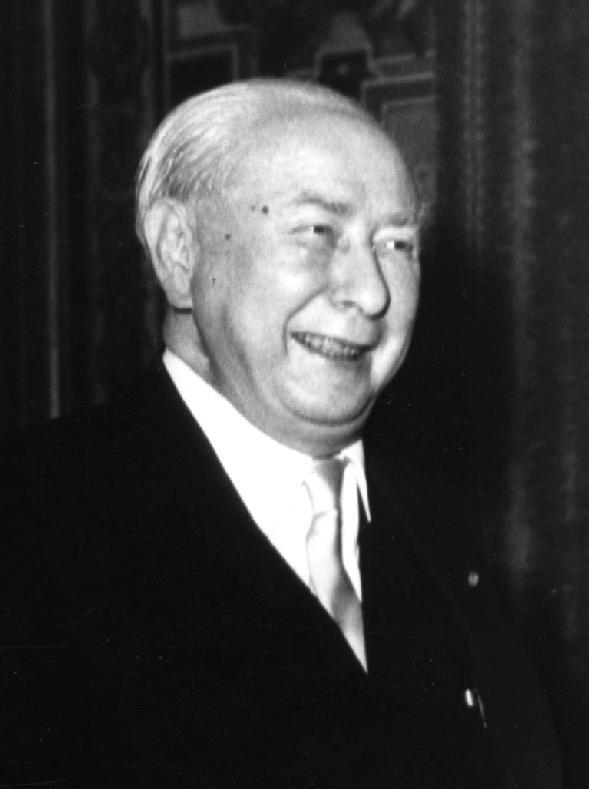
- Heuss in 1957

President of Germany (Note: Due to the division of Germany, Theodor Heuss was only the President of West Germany. The term West Germany is the common English name for the Federal Republic of Germany between its formation on 23 May 1949 and the German reunification through the accession of East Germany on 3 October 1990.)
- In office 12 September 1949 – 12 September 1959
- Chancellor: Konrad Adenauer
- Preceded by: Karl Arnold (acting)
- Succeeded by: Heinrich Lübke

Leader of the Free Democratic Party
- In office 12 December 1948 – 12 September 1949
- Deputy: Franz Blücher
- Preceded by: Position established
- Succeeded by: Franz Blücher

Leader of the Free Democratic Party in the Bundestag
- In office 4 September 1949 – 12 September 1949
- Preceded by: Position established
- Succeeded by: Hermann Schäfer
Parliamentary constituencies
Member of the Bundestag for Württemberg-Baden
In office 7 September 1949 – 15 September 1949
Preceded by	Constituency established
Succeeded by	Margarete Hütter
Constituency	Free Democratic Party List
Member of the Parliamentary Council for Württemberg-Baden
In office 1 September 1948 – 5 August 1949
Preceded by	Constituency established
Succeeded by	Constituency abolished
Member of the Landtag of Württemberg-Baden
In office 10 December 1946 – 16 September 1949
Preceded by	Constituency established
Succeeded by	Anna Hartnagel
Constituency	Democratic People's Party List
Member of the Reichstag
In office 13 October 1930 – 8 July 1933
Constituency	Württemberg
In office 5 January 1925 – 13 June 1928
Constituency	Württemberg

Personal details
- Born: 31 January 1884 Brackenheim, Germany
- Died: 12 December 1963 (aged 79) Stuttgart, West Germany
- Party: FVG (1903–1910); FVP (1910–1918); DDP (1918–1933); DPD (1947–1948); FDP (1948–1963)
- Spouse: Elly Knapp (m. 1908; died 1952)
- Children: 1
- Education: Friedrich Wilhelm University of Berlin; Ludwig-Maximilians-Universität München (Dr. rer. pol.)
- Profession: Journalist

Theodor Heuss (German: [ˈteːodoːɐ̯ ˈhɔʏs]; 31 January 1884 – 12 December 1963) was a German politician who served as the first president of West Germany from 1949 to 1959. To date, he is one of only two German presidents, along with Richard von Weizsäcker (1984–1994), to have served two full five-year terms.

His civil demeanour and cordial nature – somewhat a contrast to German nationalist traditions and the stern character of chancellor Konrad Adenauer – largely contributed to the stabilisation of democracy in West Germany during the Wirtschaftswunder years. Before beginning his career as a politician, Heuss had been a political journalist. Heuss is remembered as a major representative of social liberalism in Germany.

== Early life and education ==
Heuss was born in Brackenheim, a small town and wine-making community near Heilbronn in Württemberg, on the border between the historic regions of Swabia and Franconia.

He attended the Karlsgymnasium in Heilbronn, from which he graduated in 1902. It has since been renamed the Theodor-Heuss-Gymnasium.

Heuss studied economics, art history and political science at the Ludwig-Maximilians-Universität München and the Friedrich Wilhelm University of Berlin. He received his doctorate at the Ludwig-Maximilians-Universität München, with social reformer Lujo Brentano serving as his thesis adviser, in 1905. Heuss was also a student of Friedrich Naumann, a social liberal politician and theologian. On 11 April 1908, he married Elly Heuss-Knapp (1881–1952), with whom he had a son. The minister presiding over the Lutheran wedding ceremony held in Straßburg was Albert Schweitzer, a close friend of Elly.

== Career ==
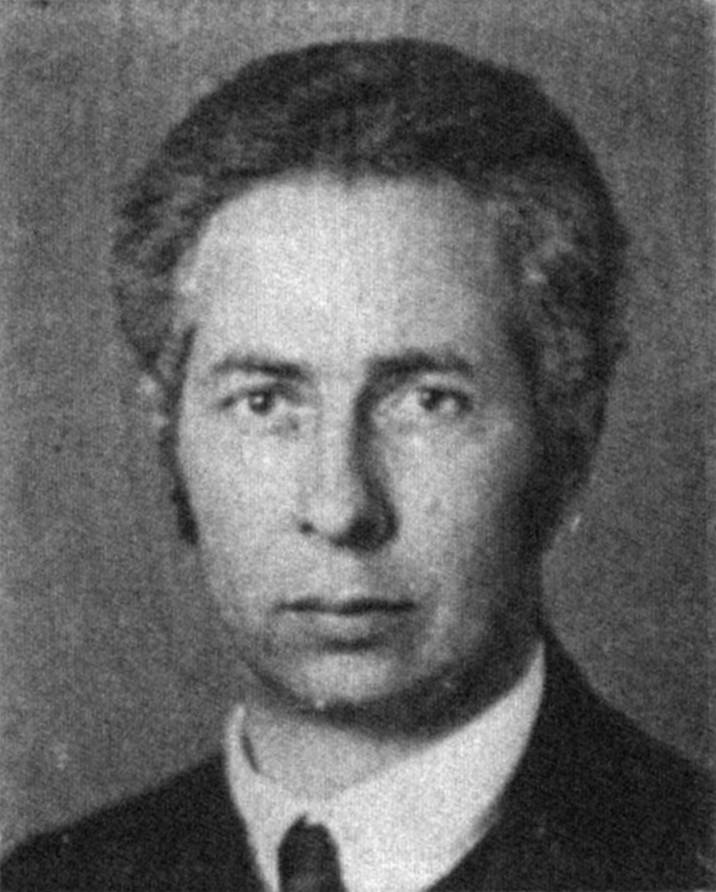
Heuss's official Reichstag portrait, 1924

After his studies, Heuss worked as a political journalist in Berlin and from 1905 until 1912 presided over the magazine Die Hilfe ("The Aid") published by Friedrich Naumann. From 1912 to 1918, he was editor in chief of the liberal Neckarzeitung (Neckar Newspaper) in Heilbronn. In Berlin, he worked as editor for the weekly newsletter Deutsche Politik ("German Politics") and the magazine Die Deutsche Nation ("The German Nation"). With Naumann, Heuss in 1903 joined the liberal Free-minded Union, which in 1910 merged into the Progressive People's Party (Fortschrittliche Volkspartei), in which he was engaged until its dissolution in 1918.

After World War I, Heuss became a member of the left liberal German Democratic Party (Deutsche Demokratische Partei, DDP), from 1930 renamed German State Party (Deutsche Staatspartei, DStP), the political heir of the Fortschrittliche Volkspartei in 1918 and was a member of the Reichstag from 1924 to 1928 and again from 1930 to 1933. He also taught as a lecturer at the Deutsche Hochschule für Politik ("German Academy for Politics") in Berlin. From 1918 to 1924, Heuss was managing director of Deutscher Werkbund, a German association of artists, architects, designers and industrialists which became an important element in the development of modern architecture and industrial design, particularly in the later creation of the Bauhaus school of design.

=== Nazi Germany ===
During the 1920s and early 1930s, Heuss was a staunch supporter of the democratic Weimar Republic and an opponent of Adolf Hitler's Nazi Party, about which he published one of the first comprehensive analyses in 1932 with the book Hitlers Weg ("Hitler's Way"). However, on 23 March 1933, along with his four fellow DStP parliamentarians, Heuss voted in favour of the Enabling Act (Ermächtigungsgesetz), granting Chancellor Adolf Hitler quasi-dictatorial powers. He had set out to abstain, but after Heinrich Brüning indicated that with regard to the Reichskonkordat the Centre Party MPs would assent, ultimately subordinated to party discipline. Alternative views of Hermann Dietrich, Weimar Republic finance minister, claim that he was part of the majority in favour of voting for the enabling law.

When Germany became a one-party state, the DStP was dissolved on 28 June 1933 and Heuss was divested of his Reichstag mandate by decree of Minister of the Interior Wilhelm Frick with effect from 8 July. He also lost his positions at the Deutsche Hochschule für Politik and at the Deutscher Werkbund. Several of his books were banned and burned during the Nazi book burnings.

Following the end of his term, he returned to private life. During the Nazi era, he stayed in contact with a network of liberals, leading to contacts with the German resistance towards the end of the war, though he was not an active resister. In 1936, Heuss faced a publication ban; nevertheless in 1941 he became an employee of the Frankfurter Zeitung, one of the few remaining liberal newspapers at that time. Heuss wrote under pseudonyms until the publishing of the paper was finally prohibited in 1943. He spent the following years writing a biography of Robert Bosch.

In 1940–1941, Heuss was a contributor to the Nazi newspaper Das Reich, launched by Joseph Goebbels as a more intellectual version of the crude antisemitism spread by Nazi publications. His eight articles were of a rather apolitical nature focussing on classical literature.

=== Postwar ===
After World War II, the US Office of Military Government gave Heuss the licence for one of the first post-war newspapers, the Rhein-Neckar-Zeitung in Heidelberg and on 24 September 1945 appointed him the first Minister of Education and Cultural Affairs in the German state of Württemberg-Baden under his fellow party member Minister-President Reinhold Maier. In this position, he was now able to drive forward the democratic re-education process. After poor results in the 1946 Württemberg-Baden state election, he resigned from his post so that Maier could stay on as Minister-President. In 1946, Heuss also took part in the constitutional consultations in Württemberg-Baden.

As a co-founder of the Democratic People's Party (Demokratische Volkspartei, DVP), the predecessor of the German Free Democratic Party (Freie Demokratische Partei, FDP) in the southwestern German states, he was a member of the Württemberg-Baden state parliament (Landtag) from 1946 to 1949, together with his wife Elly Heuss-Knapp. In 1947, he had to justify himself before a committee of enquiry of the Württemberg-Baden state assembly for having voted in favour of Hitler's Enabling Act in 1933. In his testimony, Heuss argued that the law was ultimately irrelevant to the Nazi tyranny. Heuss also taught history at the Stuttgart Institute of Technology in 1946 and 1947, receiving the title of an honorary professor in 1948.

After plans elaborated with Wilhelm Külz to build up an all-German liberal party, known as Democratic Party of Germany, had failed, Heuss in December 1948 was elected head of the West German and Berlin sections of the newly founded Free Democratic Party. He advocated uniting all liberal parties in the Western occupation zones in one centrist party, overcoming the split between right liberals and left liberals that had existed in the Weimar Republic. In 1948, he was a member of the Parlamentarischer Rat (Parliamentary Council) at Bonn with considerable influence in the drafting of West Germany's constitution, the Basic Law for the Federal Republic of Germany.

== Presidency ==
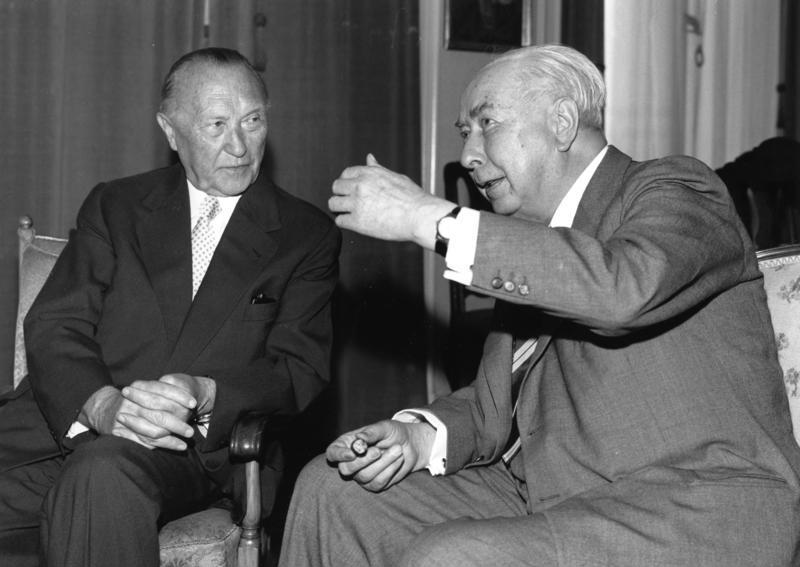
Adenauer and Heuss on 14 September 1959

After being elected to the first German Bundestag, he relinquished his parliamentary mandate on 12 September 1949, when he was elected President by the Federal Convention (Bundesversammlung) defeating the Social Democrat leader Kurt Schumacher in the second ballot. He took the oath required by Article 56 of the Basic Law before a joint session of the Bundestag and the Bundesrat on the same date. By the time he was confirmed as the first democratic German president since Paul von Hindenburg, he refused to be called "Excellency", preferring instead to be called simply "Herr Heuss", Herr Bundespräsident is the German term of address up to today. Heuss's plans for a new national anthem were aborted by Adenauer, who – in rare accordance with Kurt Schumacher – had the third stanza of the old Deutschlandlied established in 1952.

A widower since 1952, Heuss was re-elected in 1954 with practically no opposition, after the Social Democrats had renounced the nomination of a rival candidate. Not until May 1956 could he make his first state visit, invited by King Paul of Greece. The president, accompanied by Foreign Minister Heinrich von Brentano, was overwhelmed by the warm reception in Athens, considering that the country had heavily suffered under German occupation in World War II. He held office until the end of his term on 12 September 1959, succeeded by Heinrich Lübke. He had declined a third term in office, as this would have necessitated changing the constitution.

Heuss shaped the office of the president by his non-partisan governing. As a representative of the democratic-liberal and cultural traditions of Germany, he was a symbol of confidence in the German post-war republic in the international community. His further state visits to Turkey, Italy, Canada, the United States, and the United Kingdom contributed greatly to the increase of appreciation toward the still young Federal Republic of Germany. Even though being critical of German militarism, Heuss supported re-armament and the founding of the new West German Army in 1955, in agreement with the Western European partners and within the structures of NATO. Nonetheless, his ironic speech at the swearing in of the first new soldiers, "Nun siegt mal schön!" ("Happy war-winning!"), is well remembered.

In 1959, Heuss was awarded the prestigious Friedenspreis des Deutschen Buchhandels. In addressing the memory of Nazism and the Nazi dictatorship, Heuss introduced the concept of collective shame as opposed to collective guilt. His rhetoric encouraged the Germans to never forget the Holocaust and precisely described the crimes against the Jews but he refrained from citing those who were responsible for their suffering.

In 1957, Heuss donated a sculpted portal entry to the Camposanto of the Teutons and the Flemish in Vatican City. The portal, by sculptor Elmar Hillebrand of Cologne, gives access from the Teutonic Cemetery to the Church of Santa Maria della Pietà in Camposanto dei Teutonici, the National Church in Rome of Austria, Germany, and the Netherlands.

On 12 December 1963, Heuss died in Stuttgart, aged 79.

== Personal life ==
Heuss was a member of the Protestant Church in Germany. He was married to Alsace German politician, social reformer and author Elly Heuss-Knapp with whom he had one child, antifascist resistance fighter Ernst Ludwig Heuss.

== Legacy ==
Since 1964, the Theodor Heuss Prize has been awarded for exemplary democratic disposition. Heuss's former residence is now open to the public as the Theodor-Heuss-Haus. In 1994, the German Bundestag established the Theodor Heuss House Foundation (Stiftung Bundespräsident-Theodor-Heuss-Haus) as a public institution to commemorate Heuss' achievements and values and to conduct historical research and political education.

A square and subway station in Berlin are named after him.

Heuss' image appeared on one series of the two-mark coin and numerous streets and squares all over Germany have been named in his honour. During his time in office, his image also appeared on definitive stamps in West Germany issued between 1954 and 1960. An Airbus A340 aircraft of the Luftwaffe used by the German head of government also carries his name.

At least two ships were named after Theodor Heuss: One was a train ferry based in Warnemunde, launched in 1957 and decommissioned in 1997 (a long career for this type of ship) later scrapped in Alang, India and the other was an innovative rescue vessel launched 1960 (It carried state of the art electronic equipment, could sail in extreme weather conditions, was self-righting, capable of 20 Knots and carried a smaller, fully unsinkable, rescue launch on a stern ramp). It was the head of its class and though it was decommissioned and scrapped, another Theodor Heuss class rescue boat (ex HH Meier) was rechristened Theodor Heuss, fully restored and preserved in the Deutsches Museum in Munich. It is a popular Radio Controlled model as the Graupner model company marketed a fully functional kit of this popular boat.

== Honours and awards ==
- Honorary doctorate from the Free University of Berlin (1949)
- Grand Cross special class of the Order of Merit of the Federal Republic of Germany (1952)
- Knight Grand Cross with Collar of the Order of Merit of the Italian Republic (31 December 1953)
- Collar with Grand Cross Breast Star of the Order of the Falcon (Iceland, 1955)
- Justus Moser Medal (Osnabrück, 1956)
- Honorary Citizen of Olympia (1956)
- Grand Star of the Decoration for Services to the Republic of Austria (1956)
- Honorary Knight Grand Cross of the Order of the Bath (1958)
- Honorary doctorate from the Laval University (1958)
- Theodor Heuss Chair at The New School

== Notes ==
Party political offices
Position established	Leader of the Free Democratic Party; 1948–1949	Succeeded by Franz Blücher
Political offices
New title	President of West Germany; 1949–1959	Succeeded by Heinrich Lübke
