= German Cancer Aid =

German not-for-profit organization

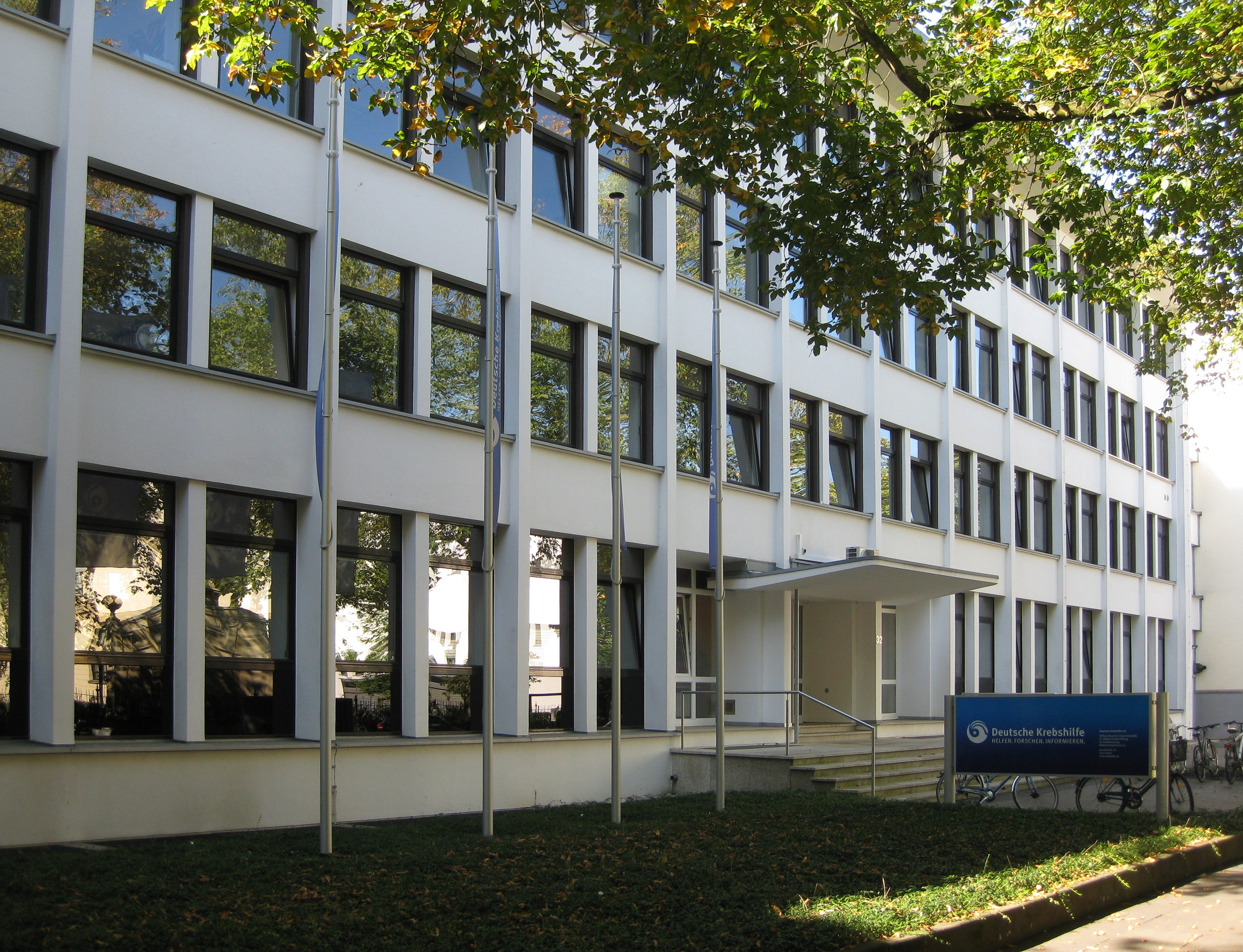
- Established: 25 September 1974, 1974 (51 years ago)
- Founders: Mildred Scheel
- Types: nonprofit organization
- Legal status: German foundation under civil law
- Aim: fight cancer in all its forms
- Headquarters: Bonn
- Country: Germany
- Coordinates: 50°43′17″N 7°06′46″E
- Chairpersons: Anne-Sophie Mutter
- Revenue: 127,600,000 ±100000 euro (2019)
- Website: www.krebshilfe.de

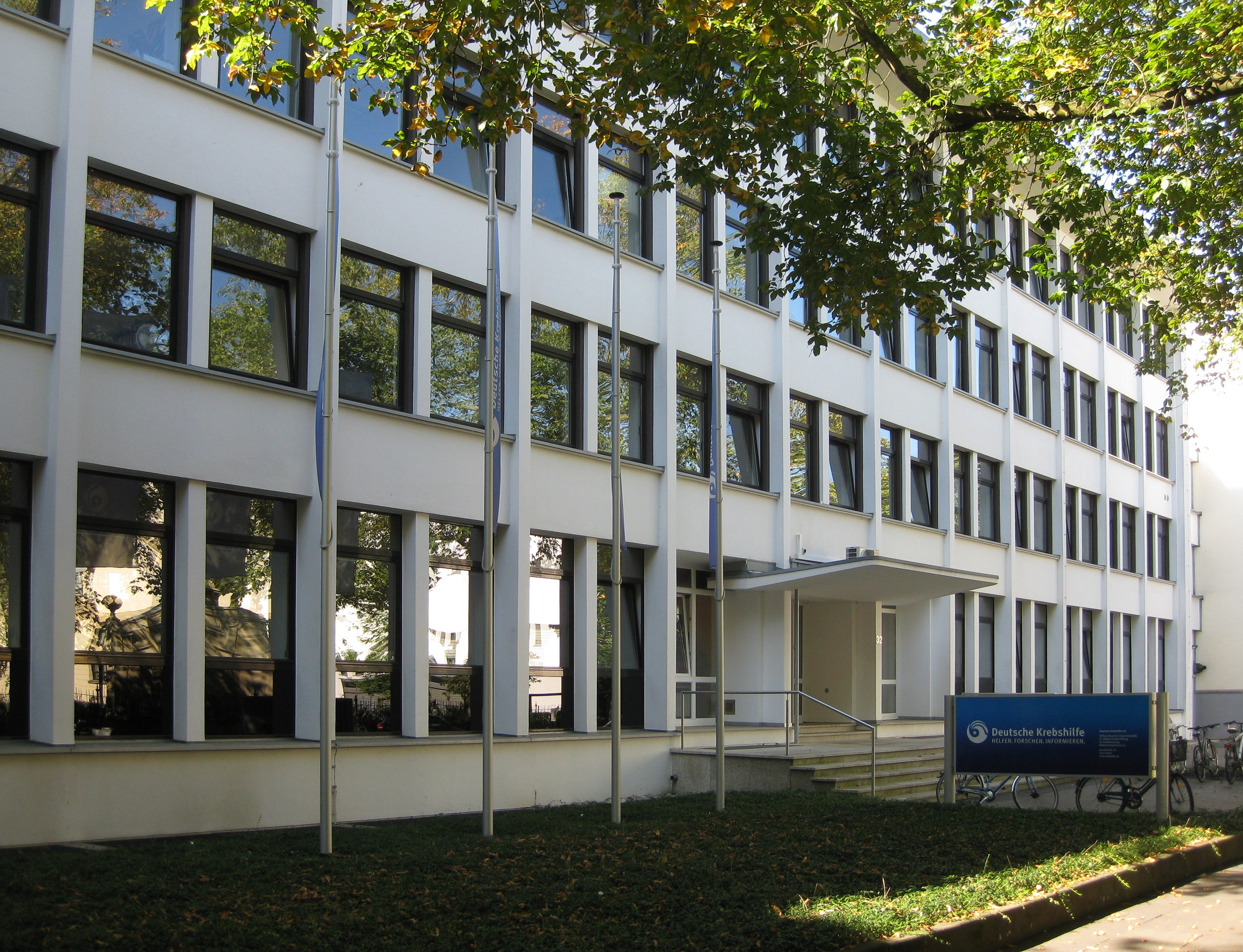
Headquarter of the German Cancer Aid, Bonn

The German Cancer Aid (German: Deutsche Krebshilfe) is a not-for-profit organization to fight cancer in all its forms. The institution was founded on September 25, 1974, by Mildred Scheel during the term of her husband, Walter Scheel, as federal president of Germany. It became the leading organization fighting cancer in Europe. From the very beginning, the organization has been supported only by private donors. The German Cancer Aid has remained independent of politics and the pharmacological industry. Mildred Scheel’s credo was: "We are only devoted to fight cancer for the benefit of all people."

== The motto and the Goal ==
Under the motto "Help. Research. Information", the organization sponsors and supports research projects to improve prevention, diagnosis, therapy, after-care and self-help. It helps to improve the equipment and personnel in hospitals and to remedy shortages and emergencies in institutions for therapy, research and rehabilitation. The German cancer patients who are in financial distress due to their disease can get advice, help and in certain cases also financial support. The German Cancer Aid and its "Dr. Mildred Scheel Foundation for Cancer Research" support numerous innovative research projects in order to develop new methods of therapy and diagnosis against cancer. The German Cancer Aid not only informs about the various types of cancer, but also about the possibilities of cancer prevention and motivates the population to get medical check-ups. "We organize and support medical education, education courses and information events in order to improve the fight against cancer", said the managing director Gerd Nettekoven.

== President, Board of Directors and Medias ==
President of the organization since 2011 is Fritz Pleitgen, author and former leading German correspondent (ARD and WDR) He is elected for five years. Pleitgen succeeded Harald zur Hausen (Nobel Prize in Physiology or Medicine 2008). He was the president of the German Cancer Aid in 2010.

The Chairman of the Board of Directors is Hans-Peter Kraemer (Cologne). He is supported by nine colleagues and cancer experts, including Otmar Wiestler. Managing director since decades is Gerd Nettekoven.

The German Cancer Aid is known for its information department. Outreach director Christiana Tschoepe is a cancer expert herself. She developed with her team brochures to inform the public regularly about the various types of cancer. All information material on cancer can be accessed free. The press office organises information events and cancer-campaigns, follows the motto "Helping. Researching. Informing." The public relation of the organization supports the German-Transatlantic cooperation to fight cancer.

== Headquarters and institutions ==
The headquarters of the German Cancer Aid are located at Busch-Strasse 32, in 53113 Bonn. An additional office is in the German capital Berlin, in order to keep contacts to the government administration and the Parliament. The headquarters in Bonn manage the day-to-day business of the subsidiary organizations. These are: •Dr. Mildred Scheel Foundation for Cancer Research, founded on February 16, 1976 •Mildred Scheel Kreis e.V., Association, established on November 7, 1977 •Dr. Mildred Scheel Academy of Education and Research GmbH (Cologne), founded on April 30, 1992

== German Cancer Congress ==
The German Cancer Congress 2014 in Berlin was organized by the first time in cooperation of the German Cancer Aid and the German Cancer Society. Both leading institutions are bringing their experts and expertise, along with many other relevant specialists in this multifaceted and complex field of oncological patient care, to the conference.

Since 1951, the German Cancer Congress has been organized by the German Cancer Society. The event is the largest and oldest congress in Europe, covering cancer diagnostics and therapy in Germany. The Congress program focuses on the three substantial challenges that currently preoccupy cancer medicine: enhancing interdisciplinarity, rapid integration and financing of innovations, and increasing individualization of therapy decisions after molecular-genetic diagnostics.
