= Elly Heuss-Knapp =

German politician (1882–1952)

Elly Heuss
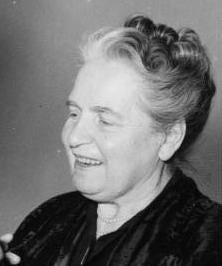

First Lady of Germany
- In role 12 September 1949 – 19 July 1952
- President: Theodor Heuss
- Preceded by: Ingeborg Dönitz
- Succeeded by: Wilhelmine Lübke

Elisabeth Eleonore Anna Justine Heuss-Knapp (née Knapp; 25 January 1882 – 19 July 1952) was a German politician of the Free Democratic Party (FDP), social reformer, author and wife of German president Theodor Heuss. She was the founder of the Müttergenesungswerk charitable organisation, officially called Elly Heuss-Knapp Foundation in her honour.

== Life ==
Elly Knapp was born in Straßburg, then capital of the Imperial Territory of Alsace-Lorraine, the daughter of the economist Georg Friedrich Knapp (1842–1927), founder of the chartalist school of monetary theory, who taught at the Straßburg University. Her mother Lydia v. Karganow (1849–1925), who was from Georgia, became mentally ill shortly after her birth and left the family when Knapp was three years old. Elly, a bright, inquisitive child, and her sister Marianne spent much time with their grandparents and were raised by their father alone, uncommon at the time.

She studied to become a teacher, taking the exam in 1899, and worked as a teacher at a girls' school in Straßburg from 1900, of which she was one of the co-founders. Concerned with civic education, she early became influenced by the liberal politician Friedrich Naumann and in 1905, she went on to study economics in Freiburg and Berlin, while becoming a frequent public speaker on political issues. In 1908, she married then-journalist Theodor Heuss, an assistant to Friedrich Naumann. The wedding in Straßburg was presided over by Albert Schweitzer. Their only son, Ernst Ludwig Heuss, was born in 1910. Due to complications during that birth (which was nearly fatal for Elly), she could not have more children.

Back in Berlin after World War I, Elly Heuss-Knapp like her husband had been a candidate for the liberal German Democratic Party (DDP) in the German federal election of 1919, strongly emphasising women's suffrage. Over the years Elly became more interested in theological questions and from 1922 became active in the Protestant congregation of Otto Dibelius in Berlin.

After the Nazi Machtergreifung in 1933, she was forbidden to speak publicly, and her husband was dismissed from his lecturing job at the university. Their home became a meeting place of people opposed to the regime, including the Dahlem pastor Martin Niemöller. Elly Heuss-Knapp became an author and also worked in advertising to support her family, developing an early kind of jingle radio commercial. Her autobiography, Ausblick vom Münsterturm, was published in 1934, and a second edition in 1952. In the final stage of the World War II Heuss-Knapp and her husband lived in Heidelberg.

After the war, she was elected a member of the Landtag state legislature in Württemberg-Baden in 1946, as a representative of the liberal Democratic People's Party (DVP) and its Free Democratic Party (FDP) successor. Her work as a politician concentrated on child care and social policy in general, earning her the reputation of an unofficial "mother of the state". She finished her parliamentary career when her husband was elected President of Germany in 1949.

Together with her husband, Elly Heuss-Knapp was one of the co-founders of the European Movement in Germany in June 1949, and was Vice President of the organisation. On 31 January 1950 she publicly announced the foundation of the Müttergenesungswerk organisation for maternal health, which remained under the patronage of the wives of the German presidents up to today. It was later named Elly-Heuss-Knapp-Stiftung – Deutsches Müttergenesungswerk in her honour.

Elly Heuss-Knapp died in 1952 at the university clinic in Bonn, and was buried at the Stuttgart Waldfriedhof cemetery.

== Books ==
- Elly Heuss-Knapp: Bürgerkunde und Volkswirtschaftslehre für Frauen (1910).
- Elly Heuss-Knapp: Schmale Wege, Verlag Wunderlich, 1946
- Georg Friedrich Knapp, Elly Heuss-Knapp: Eine Jugend. Deutsche Verl.-Anst.; Auflage: 2., erw. Aufl. (1947)
- Elly Heuss-Knapp: Ausblick vom Münsterturm. Erinnerungen. Verlag R. Wunderlich, Tübingen 1984, ISBN 3-8052-0086-2
- Elly Heuss-Knapp, Margarethe Vater: Bürgerin zweier Welten . Verlag Wunderlich, 1961

== Notes ==
Unofficial roles
First	Spouse of the President of West Germany; 1949–1952	Vacant Title next held by Wilhelmine Lübke
