= Catholic theology of sexuality =

Catholic theology of sexuality, like Catholic theology in general, is drawn from natural law, canonical scripture, divine revelation, and sacred tradition, as interpreted authoritatively by the magisterium of the Catholic Church. Sexual morality evaluates sexual behavior according to standards laid out by Catholic moral theology, and often provides general principles by which Catholics can evaluate whether specific actions meet these standards.

The Catholic Church teaches that sexual intercourse has a two-fold unitive and procreative purpose; According to the Catechism of the Catholic Church, "conjugal love ... aims at a deeply personal unity, a unity that, beyond union in one flesh, leads to forming one heart and soul", since the marriage bond is to be a sign of the love between God and humanity.

Because Catholics believe God found everything He created to be "very good", the Catholic Church teaches that the human body and sex must likewise be good. Every person is created in the image of God and therefore has great dignity including their sexuality. Sexuality is not something that exists with purely biological purpose defined by personal preference; rather, it is an intimate nucleus of the person that spiritually is designed by God to unite man and woman as one-flesh - not because man and woman preferred it this way, but because God designed and created woman to be equal but different from man. Genesis describes the man’s official companion being made from a bone of his bones and the flesh of his flesh.

In cases in which sexual expression is sought outside marriage, or in which the procreative function of sexual expression within marriage is "deliberately frustrated" (e.g., the use of artificial contraception), the Catholic Church considers them a grave sin. According to the Catechism, among what are considered sins against chastity are masturbation, fornication, pornography, and homosexual practices. Additionally, "adultery, divorce, polygamy, and free union are grave offenses against the dignity of marriage".

In the history of Catholic theology, there have been significant differing opinions on the nature of the severity of various sexual sins. In the present, there exists still wide opinions by theologians and much of the laity on official teaching on sexuality.

== Natural law ==
Natural law (Latin: lex naturalis) refers to the use of reason to analyze human nature to deduce binding rules of moral behavior from God's creation of reality and mankind. "The natural law is written and engraved in the soul of each and every man, because it is human reason ordaining him to do good and forbidding him to sin." It is called "Natural", because the reason which decrees it properly belongs to human nature. Its main precepts are found in the Ten Commandments.

In the Summa Theologica, St. Thomas Aquinas wrote: "...the rational creature is subject to Divine providence in the most excellent way, in so far as it partakes of a share of providence, by being provident both for itself and for others. Wherefore it has a share of the Eternal Reason, whereby it has a natural inclination to its proper act and end: and this participation of the eternal law in the rational creature is called the natural law.

== Scripture ==
The Old Testament described occurrences of polygamy, concubines, and divorce with remarriage. Many of the patriarchs, including Abraham, Isaac, Jacob, King David, and King Solomon, practiced polygamy and/or concubinage despite God establishing monogamy (Genesis 2:24) and later clarified in the New Testament (Matthew 19:4-8). In Matthew's Gospel, Jesus attested that from the beginning God made one man and one woman to cleave to each other. Further, divorce was permitted in the Mosaic law due to humankind’s hardened hearts therefore implying that a softened heart when turned to truly honor God, practices a holier nature as intentionally designed by God from the beginning. Scripture repeatedly suggests these practices to be problematic, and clear instruction from God is included in both Old Testament (Deuteronomy 17:17) and New Testament.

The Didache states that abortion is sinful. The earliest Christian texts on abortion condemn it with "no mention of any distinction in seriousness between the abortion of a formed fetus and that of an unformed embryo." However, prior to the 19th century, abortion was often distinguished between later-term abortions which were treated as murder (especially after "quickening"), and early abortion which was associated with the sin of contraception.

In the New Testament, Christ and the Apostle Paul praised the greatness of single life for the kingdom of God.

== Patristic theology ==
Augustine of Hippo, considered a saint and church father by the Catholic Church, having lived a hedonistic lifestyle in his early youth, later followed the strictly dualistic religion of Manicheanism, which was deeply hostile to the material world, despising sexual activity. Eventually, under the influence of his Catholic Christian mother Monica, Augustine converted to Christianity, and later wrote of this conversion in his Confessions, including details of the sexually related aspects of said conversion. The following passage from his autobiography describes a critical turning point in his change of sexual morality:

So quickly I returned to the place where Alypius was sitting; for there had I put down the volume of the apostles, when I rose thence. I grasped, opened, and in silence read that paragraph on which my eyes first fell: "Not in rioting and drunkenness, not in chambering and wantonness, not in strife and envying; but put ye on the Lord Jesus Christ, and make not provision for the flesh, to fulfil the lusts thereof." [Romans 13:13-14] No further would I read, nor did I need...

== Medieval theology ==
Thomas Aquinas wrote the following regarding chastity in his Summa Theologiae:

The word "chastity" is employed in two ways. First, properly; and thus it is a special virtue having a special matter, namely the concupiscences relating to venereal pleasures. Secondly, the word "chastity" is employed metaphorically: for just as a mingling of bodies conduces to venereal pleasure which is the proper matter of chastity and of lust its contrary vice, so too the spiritual union of the mind with certain things conduces to a pleasure which is the matter of a spiritual chastity metaphorically speaking, as well as of a spiritual fornication likewise metaphorically so called. For if the human mind delight in the spiritual union with that to which it behooves it to be united, namely God, and refrains from delighting in union with other things against the requirements of the order established by God, this may be called a spiritual chastity, according to 2 Cor. 11:2, "I have espoused you to one husband, that I may present you as a chaste virgin to Christ." If, on the other hand, the mind be united to any other things whatsoever, against the prescription of the Divine order, it will be called spiritual fornication, according to Jer. 3:1, "But thou hast prostituted thyself to many lovers." Taking chastity in this sense, it is a general virtue, because every virtue withdraws the human mind from delighting in a union with unlawful things. Nevertheless, the essence of this chastity consists principally in charity and the other theological virtues, whereby the human mind is united to God.

In her Eunuchs for the Kingdom of Heaven, Uta Ranke-Heinemann says that three discussions of marriage in the New Testament (Matthew 19, I Corinthians 7, and Ephesians 5:22-32) do not refer to generating children, which later became consistently emphasized in Catholic moral doctrine as the primary purpose of sexual relations. The view that marriage is primarily intended for the purpose of procreation dominated early Christianity and was held by many Church Fathers. During the Middle Ages, the question of when intercourse was allowed was very important. Intercourse was prohibited on all Sundays and on all the many feast days, as well as on the 20 days before Christmas, on the 40 days before Easter, for three or more days before receiving Communion (which at that time was offered only a few times a year), and often on the 20 days before Pentecost. These forbidden days altogether totaled about 40% of each year. Some church leaders warned believers that children conceived on holy days would be born leprous, epileptic, diabolically possessed, or crippled. Penalties of 20 to 40 days of strict fasting on bread and water were imposed on transgressors. Intercourse was forbidden during the menstrual period and after childbirth, since "physicians mistakenly believed that the blood of a menstruating woman or one who has just given birth was poisonous". It was also forbidden during pregnancy, with concern for protecting the fetus as the main reason. "Christian theologians", including Pope Gregory I, held that abstinence should continue until a baby was weaned.

Scholastic theologians from the 11th to 13th centuries shifted the time scheme to motives; the desire to procreate with "joy in a new servant of God" was considered the best motive for intercourse. Bertold of Regensburg considered a woman innocent if she was forced by her husband to engage in intercourse at a prohibited time. Because intercourse was only allowed for procreative reasons, various penitentials (rule books) also forbade intercourse between sterile or older partners, although never assigning a penalty. Heinemann says that oral and anal intercourse were often punished by more years of penance than premeditated murder, as they prevented conception from occurring. Although practices varied, menstruating women were often forbidden to attend Mass or receive Communion; the Latin Church took a more moderate stance on this question than the Eastern Churches did. Since the blood from childbirth was believed more harmful than menstrual blood, the Synod of Trier (1227) ruled that women who had just given birth had to be "reconciled with the Church" before they were allowed to enter church. They often could not buried in the cemetery if they died in childbirth before having undergone a purifying ritual; this policy, however, was rejected by several synods. The Council of Trent (1566), and several synods afterwards, did not impose abstinence from intercourse on certain times as an "obligation", but as an "admonition".

== Early modern theology ==
The Doctor of the Church St. Alphonsus Liguori, a preeminent moral theologian, considered therapeutic abortions to save the mother from immediate danger justified. In his 1869 bull, Apostolicae Sedis, Pope Pius IX instituted a Church policy labeling all abortion as homicide and condemning abortion regardless of the stage of pregnancy. However, some interpretations of Apostolicae Sedis held that excommunication for abortion did not extend to the mother.

== Magisterium since 1917 ==
- 1917 Code of Canon Law extended excommunication for abortion to the mother
- Casti connubii (1930) by Pope Pius XI
- Humanae vitae (1968) by Pope Paul VI
- Persona humana (1975) by the Congregation for the Doctrine of the Faith
- Theology of the Body by Pope John Paul II
- Evangelium vitae (1995) by Pope John Paul II
- Donum Vitae (1987) by the Congregation for the Doctrine of the Faith
- Veritatis splendor (1993) by Pope John Paul II
- Catechism of the Catholic Church (1992)
- Deus caritas est (2005) by Pope Benedict XVI
- Amoris laetitia (2016) by Pope Francis

== Dissent ==
A 1977 study entitled Human Sexuality: New Directions in American Catholic Thought, co-written by Rev. Anthony Kosnik, showed that dissent from the Holy See's teachings on sexuality was common among United States theologians. Reaction to the study showed that the dissent was not unanimous. In 1979, the Sacred Congregation for the Doctrine of the Faith publicised an advisory that deplored the books's "erroneous conclusions", identified "numerous misreadings of the teaching of the Second Vatican Council" in it, and said that the book diminished "the morality of sexual love to a matter of 'personal sentiments, feelings, [and] customs ... .'" George Weigel asserted that "these theological errors led to practical guidelines that 'either dissociate themselves from or directly contradict Catholic teaching' as taught by the Church's highest teaching authority."

A 2014 Guttmacher survey of US abortion patients found that Catholics are as likely as the general population to terminate a pregnancy. As of 2022, ninety-eight percent of sexually active American Catholic women have used a form of contraception other than natural family planning. Seventy-four percent of Catholics who regularly attend Mass believe that premarital sex with a committed partner is morally acceptable in some circumstances.

The Winnipeg Statement is the Canadian Conference of Catholic Bishops' 1968 statement on the papal encyclical Humanae vitae from a plenary assembly held at Saint Boniface in Winnipeg, Manitoba. In it, the Canadian bishops rejected Pope Paul VI's July 1968 encyclical on human life and the regulation of birth.

In 2023, Cardinal Robert McElroy stated that "the moral tradition in the church that all sexual sins are grave matter" was a 17th century innovation.

== Teachings on specific subjects ==
=== Virgin Mary ===
Since the time of the church fathers, the church has believed in the perpetual virginity of Mary. In the Litany of Loreto Mary is called the virgin of virgins and queen of virgins. Mary's chastity is considered an example for all Christians to follow by the church.

=== Virtue ===
==== Chastity ====
The Catholic Church defines chastity as the virtue that moderates the sexual appetite. It refers to the successful integration of sexuality within the person. Everyone is called to chastity. Unmarried Catholics express chastity through sexual abstinence. Sexual intercourse within marriage is considered chaste when it retains the twofold significance of union and procreation. Pope John Paul II wrote:

At the center of the spirituality of marriage, therefore, there lies chastity not only as a moral virtue (formed by love), but likewise as a virtue connected with the gifts of the Holy Spirit—above all, the gift of respect for what comes from God (donum pietatis). This gift is in the mind of the author of the Ephesians when he exhorts married couples to "defer to one another out of reverence for Christ" (Eph 5:21). So the interior order of married life, which enables the manifestations of affection to develop according to their right proportion and meaning, is a fruit not only of the virtue which the couple practice, but also of the gifts of the Holy Spirit with which they cooperate.

==== Marriage ====
Marriage is a sacrament, and a public commitment between a man and a woman. Marriage builds the family and the society. The Church considers the expression of love between husband and wife to be an elevated form of human activity, joining husband and wife in complete, mutual self-giving, and opening their relationship to new life. As Pope Paul VI wrote in Humanae vitae, "The sexual activity, in which husband and wife are intimately and chastely united with one another, through which human life is transmitted, is, as the recent Council recalled, 'noble and worthy.'"

Much of the Church's detailed doctrines derive from the principle that "sexual pleasure is morally disordered when sought for itself, isolated from its procreative and unitive [between spouses] purposes". At the same time, the Bishops at Vatican II decreed that the essential procreative end of marriage does not make "the other purposes of matrimony of less account."

Because sex is considered chaste only within context of marriage, it has come to be called the "nuptial act" in Catholic discourse. Among Catholics, the nuptial act is considered to be the conjoining of a man and a woman through sexual intercourse, considered an act of love between two married persons, and is considered in this way, a gift from God. When discussing chastity, the Catechism lists several transgressions and sins against it.

The Church holds that the legal separation of spouses while maintaining the marriage bond can be legitimate in certain cases provided for by canon law.

=== Sins ===
==== Adultery ====
One of the ten commandments states: "Do not commit adultery".

The Catechism of the Catholic Church states that two partners commit adultery when they have sexual relations, even transient ones, while at least one of them is married to another party. There, adultery is defined as an injustice because it is an injury of the covenant of the marriage bond, a transgression of the other spouse, an undermining of the institution of marriage and a compromising of the welfare of children who need their parents' stable union.

==== Child sex abuse and incest ====
Incest and child sex abuse are counted as sins in the church's catechism in paragraphs 2388–2389.

==== Contraception ====
The Church has been opposed to contraception for as far back as one can historically trace. Many early Catholic Church Fathers made statements condemning the use of contraception including John Chrysostom, Jerome, Clement of Alexandria, Hippolytus of Rome, Augustine of Hippo and various others. Among the condemnations is one by Jerome which refers to an apparent oral form of contraception: "Some go so far as to take potions, that they may insure barrenness, and thus murder human beings almost before their conception." The Catechism specifies that all marriage acts must be both unitive and procreative. In addition to condemning use of artificial birth control as intrinsically evil, non-procreative sex acts such as mutual masturbation and anal sex are ruled out as ways to avoid pregnancy.

Pope Paul VI, rejecting the majority report of the 1963–66 Pontifical Commission on Birth Control, confirmed the Catholic Church's traditional teaching on contraception, defined as "every action which, whether in anticipation of the conjugal act, or in its accomplishment, or in the development of its natural consequences, proposes, whether as an end or as a means, to render procreation impossible", declaring it evil, and excluded. Prohibited acts with contraceptive effect include sterilization, condoms and other barrier methods, spermicides, coitus interruptus (withdrawal method), the Pill, and all other such methods. Restricting sexual activity to times when conception is unlikely (natural family planning and similar practices) is not deemed sinful. The Catechism of the Catholic Church says that the spacing of births may be practiced for "just reasons" and not "motivated by selfishness".

John Paul II said in Familiaris consortio,

Thus the innate language that expresses the total reciprocal self-giving of husband and wife is overlaid, through contraception, by an objectively contradictory language, namely, that of not giving oneself totally to the other. This leads not only to a positive refusal to be open to life but also to a falsification of the inner truth of conjugal love, which is called upon to give itself in personal totality.... the difference, both anthropological and moral, between contraception and recourse to the rhythm of the cycle . . . involves in the final analysis two irreconcilable concepts of the human person and of human sexuality.

In January 2015, during his return flight from a visit to the Philippines, Pope Francis was asked by a German journalist for his thoughts on the findings of some polls that most Filipinos think the population growth in the country, with each woman having on average three children, is one of the chief reasons for its poverty, and that many there disagree with Catholic teaching on contraception. He replied that the key is "responsible parenthood":

Some people think that—excuse my expression here—that in order to be good Catholics we have to be like rabbits. No. Responsible parenthood. This is clear and that is why in the Church there are marriage groups, there are experts in this matter, there are pastors, one can search; and I know so many ways that are licit and that have helped this.

He also said that Pope Paul VI's teaching was prophetic, in view of the drop of the birth rate in some countries to little more than one child per woman.

===== Medical use =====
The Church does not consider at all illicit the use of those therapeutic means necessary to cure bodily diseases, even if a foreseeable impediment to procreation should result therefrom, so long as the contraceptive effect is not directly intended for any motive whatsoever. For example, the use of female steroid hormones as treatment for endometriosis rather than with contraceptive intent is not considered to conflict in any way with Catholic teaching. Moral theologians call this the principle of double effect.

The use of condoms to prevent disease is a more controversial and more complex issue, with theologians arguing both sides.

In November 2010 Pope Benedict said that it was a responsible act, though still not a truly moral solution, to use condoms in some very special cases as a device for the prevention of disease. He gave male prostitutes as an example, where the purpose is to "reduce the risk of infection" from HIV. While still believing that contraceptive devices interfere with the creation of life, the Pope stated that in that particular case, it can be a responsible act to raise awareness of the nature of such an act, and as a benefit, to avoid death and save life, though only as a first step, not a truly moral solution, before convincing the male prostitute of a truly moral solution, which means ceasing prostitution and sexual activity outside of marriage. There was some confusion at first whether the statement applied only to homosexual prostitutes and thus not to heterosexual intercourse at all. However, Federico Lombardi, spokesman of the Vatican, clarified that it applied to heterosexual and transsexual prostitutes, both male and female, as well. He also clarified that, in the interview, the Pope did not reverse the Church's centuries-old prohibition on contraceptive use in the context of heterosexual sexual acts, which the Church states must always be open to the transmission of life.

==== Abortion ====
In Christianity, and in the Catholic Church in particular, opinion was divided on how serious abortion was in comparison with such acts as contraception, oral sex, and sex in marriage for pleasure rather than procreation; and the Catholic Church did not begin vigorously opposing abortion until the 19th century. However, as early as ~100 A.D. the Didache taught that abortion was sinful. Several historians have written that prior to the 19th century most Catholic authors did not regard termination of pregnancy before "quickening" or "ensoulment" as a homicide. Among these authors were the Doctors of the Church: St. Augustine, St. Thomas Aquinas, and St. Alphonsus Liguori. Pope Sixtus V (1585–90) was the only Pope before Pope Pius IX (in his 1869 bull, Apostolicae Sedis) to institute a Church policy labeling all abortion as homicide and condemning abortion regardless of the stage of pregnancy. In fact, Sixtus' pronouncement of 1588 was reversed three years later by Pope Gregory XIV. In the recodification of Canon Law in 1917, Apostolicae Sedis was strengthened, in part to remove a possible reading that excluded excommunication of the mother. Statements made in 1992 in the Catechism of the Catholic Church promulgated by Pope John Paul II, the codified summary of the current Church's teachings, considered abortion from the moment of conception as homicide and called for the end of legal abortion.

==== Fornication ====
The Catholic Church forbids fornication (sexual intercourse between two people not married to each other) as a "grave matter" (see mortal sin), calling it "gravely contrary to the dignity of persons and of human sexuality".

==== Homosexuality ====
The Catechism devotes a separate section to homosexuality within its explanation of the sixth commandment. The Church distinguishes between "homosexual attractions", which are not considered sinful, and "homosexual acts", which are considered sinful. Like all heterosexual acts outside of marriage, homosexual acts are considered sins against this commandment. The Catechism states that they "violate natural law, cannot bring forth life, and do not proceed from a genuine affective and sexual complementarity. Under no circumstances can they be approved." The Church teaches that a homosexual inclination is "objectively disordered" and can be a great trial for the person for whom the Church teaches must be "accepted with respect, compassion and sensitivity ... unjust discrimination in their regard should be avoided."

The homosexual person is, according to the Church, "called to chastity". They are instructed to practice the virtues of "self-mastery" that teaches "inner freedom" using the support of friends, prayer and grace found in the sacraments of the Church. These tools are meant to help the homosexually inclined person to "gradually and resolutely approach Christian perfection", which is a state to which all Christians are called.

On 26 August 2018, Pope Francis said in Ireland that homosexual people have existed throughout the entire history of mankind. He teaches Catholic parents to talk with their homosexual children and that they are part of their families and should not be "thrown out" of the family. On 27 August 2018 a press statement by Pope Francis declared that homosexuality is not an illness.

On December 18, 2023, non-liturgical blessings of same-sex couples, not the illicit unions themselves, were approved by Pope Francis and published in Fiducia supplicans, a document by the Dicastery for the Doctrine of the Faith, which stated that "...the Church does not have the power to impart blessings on unions of persons of the same sex."

==== Lust ====
In Catholic theology, lust is considered to be an excessive, that is, irrational, attachment to venereal pleasure. It is considered as one of the seven capital sins, and its opposing virtue is chastity. The Catholic Church disapproves of lust: "Sexual pleasure is morally disordered when sought for itself, isolated from its procreative and unitive purposes".

The biblical quote "But I say to you, everyone who looks at a woman with lust has already committed adultery with her in his heart.", is considered as proof that the sins which emanate from lust can be both external and internal.

==== Masturbation ====
The Catholic Church disapproves of masturbation. Thomas Aquinas, one of the most prominent Doctors of the Catholic Church, wrote that masturbation was an "unnatural vice" which is a species of lust", but that it is a less serious form than bestiality, which is "the most serious", and than sodomy, which is the next most serious: "By procuring pollution [i.e., ejaculation apart from intercourse], without any copulation, for the sake of venereal pleasure ... pertains to the sin of 'uncleanness' which some call 'effeminacy' [Latin: mollitiem, lit. 'softness, unmanliness']."

More recently, from the Youcat:

409 Masturbation is an offense against love, because it makes the excitement of sexual pleasure an end in itself and uncouples it from the holistic unfolding of love between a man and a woman. That is why "sex with yourself" is a contradiction in terms. The Church does not demonize masturbation, but she warns against trivializing it. In fact many young people and adults are in danger of becoming isolated in their consumption of lewd pictures, films, and Internet services instead of finding love in a personal relationship. Loneliness can lead to a blind alley in which masturbation becomes an addiction. Living by the motto "For sex I do not need anyone; I will have it myself, however and whenever I need it" makes nobody happy.

According to Catholic Church teaching, "to form an equitable judgment about the subjects' moral responsibility and to guide pastoral action, one must take into account the affective immaturity, force of acquired habit, conditions of anxiety, or other psychological or social factors that lessen or even extenuate moral culpability."

==== Pornography ====
The Catholic Church disapproves of pornography and says that civil authorities should prevent the production and distribution of pornographic materials.

==== Prostitution ====
The Catholic Church condemns prostitution as a societal vice. Both St. Thomas Aquinas and St. Augustine agreed in condemning prostitution as sinful. However, they defended the legal protection of prostitution by even Catholic monarchies lest it cause society to collapse.

==== Rape ====
The Catholic Church condemns rape as "always an intrinsically evil act." The Magisterium allows women the prudential use of Plan B by rape victims to prevent pregnancy. A 2009 edition of a USCCB document titled Ethical and Religious Directives for Catholic Health Care Services states that treatment with medications preventative of ovulation or fertilization is permissible if testing proves that conception has not taken place. However, it also states that Catholic healthcare providers may not prescribe treatments to rape victims that will interfere with the implantation of an already conceived zygote within the womb.

== See also ==
- Women in the Catholic Church
