= Frauenlob =

Frauenlob is the name of:

== People ==
- Heinrich Frauenlob (1250/60–1318), a minnesinger
- Johann Frauenlob, writer

== Ships ==
- SMS Frauenlob (1855), a Prussian schooner
- SMS Frauenlob (1902), a Gazelle-class cruiser of the German Imperial Navy
