= 1969 West German presidential election =

- 5 March 1969
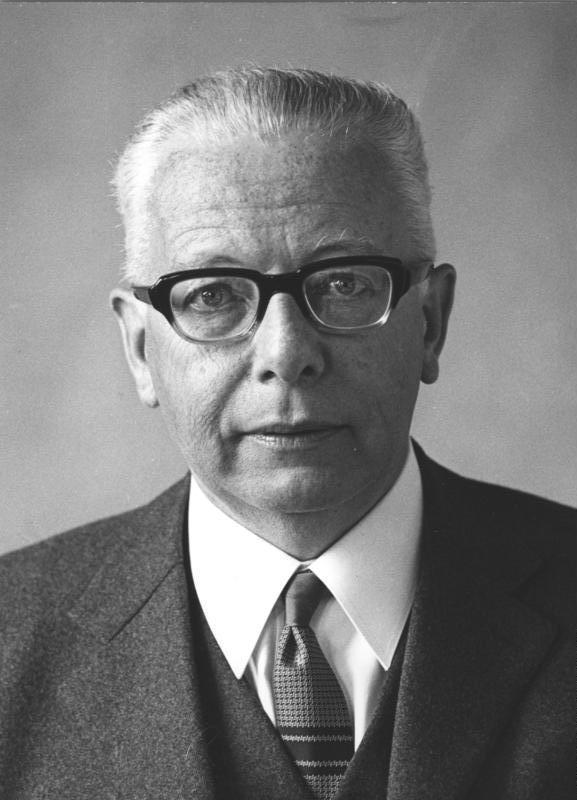

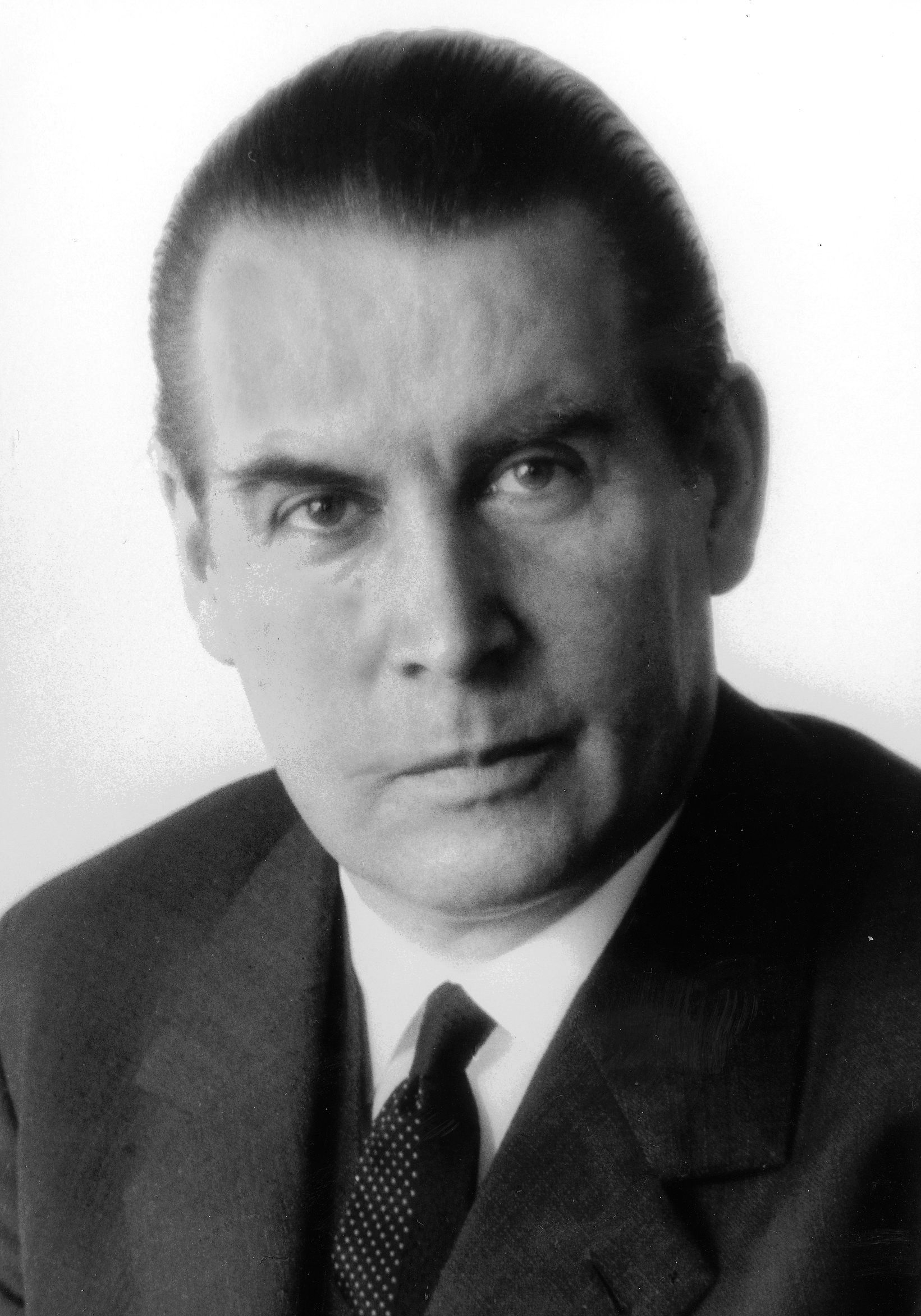
Nominee	Gustav Heinemann	Gerhard Schröder
Party	SPD	CDU
Electoral vote	514 (1st round); 511 (2nd round); 512 (3rd round)	501 (1st round); 507 (2nd round); 506 (3rd round)
Percentage	49.4%	48.8%
Nominators	SPD, FDP	CDU/CSU, NPD
President before election
Heinrich Lübke
CDU
Elected President
Gustav Heinemann
SPD

An indirect presidential election (officially the 5th Federal Convention) was held in West Germany on 5 March 1969. The incumbent president, Heinrich Lübke, had served two terms and was therefore ineligible for a third. The Christian Democratic Union nominated defense minister Gerhard Schröder. Schröder was a controversial choice, even within his own party, since he had been a member of the NSDAP and the SA under Hitler. Other potential candidates included Helmut Kohl and Richard von Weizsäcker, relatively unknown names at the time, who would go on to serve as chancellor and president, respectively. Justice Minister Gustav Heinemann was nominated by the Social Democratic Party (SPD) and supported by the opposition Free Democratic Party. With neither candidate able to win an absolute majority, Heinemann won the election on the third ballot by only 6 votes.

Gustav Heinemann became the first SPD candidate to be elected German president in 50 years.

== Composition of the Federal Convention ==
The president is elected by the Federal Convention consisting of all the members of the Bundestag and an equal number of delegates representing the states. These are divided proportionally by population to each state, and each state's delegation is divided among the political parties represented in its parliament so as to reflect the partisan proportions in the parliament.

By party
Party	Members
CDU/CSU	482
SPD	449
FDP	83
NPD	22
Total	1036

By state
State	Members
Bundestag	518
Baden-Württemberg	75
Bavaria	89
Berlin	18
Bremen	6
Hamburg	16
Hesse	46
Lower Saxony	60
North Rhine-Westphalia	145
Rhineland-Palatinate	31
Saarland	10
Schleswig-Holstein	22
Total	1036

== Results ==
Candidate	Parties	First round		Second round		Third round	
Candidate	Parties	Votes	%	Votes	%	Votes	%
Gustav Heinemann	SPD, FDP	514	49.6	511	49.3	512	49.4
Gerhard Schröder	CDU/CSU, NPD	501	48.4	507	48.9	506	48.8
Abstentions		5	0.5	5	0.5	5	0.5
Invalid votes		3	0.3	0	0	0	0
Not present		13	1.3	13	1.3	13	1.3
Total		1,036	98.75	1,036	98.75	1036	98.75
