= 1919 German presidential election =

- 11 February 1919
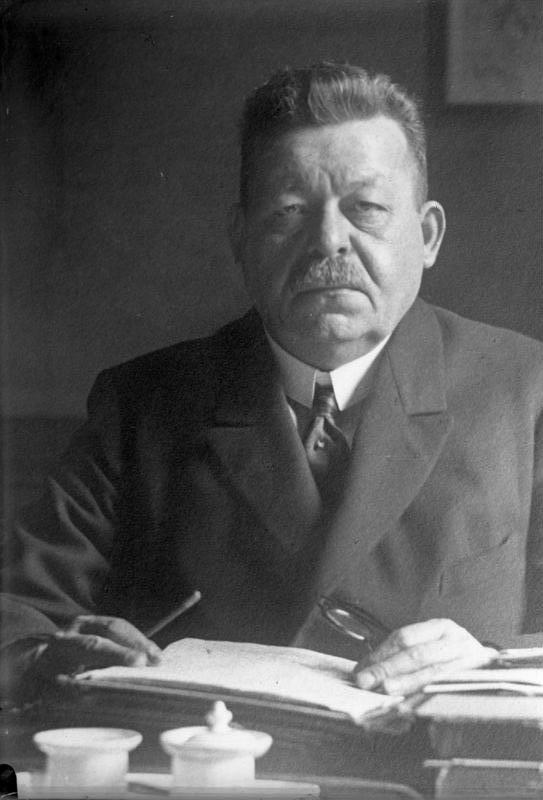

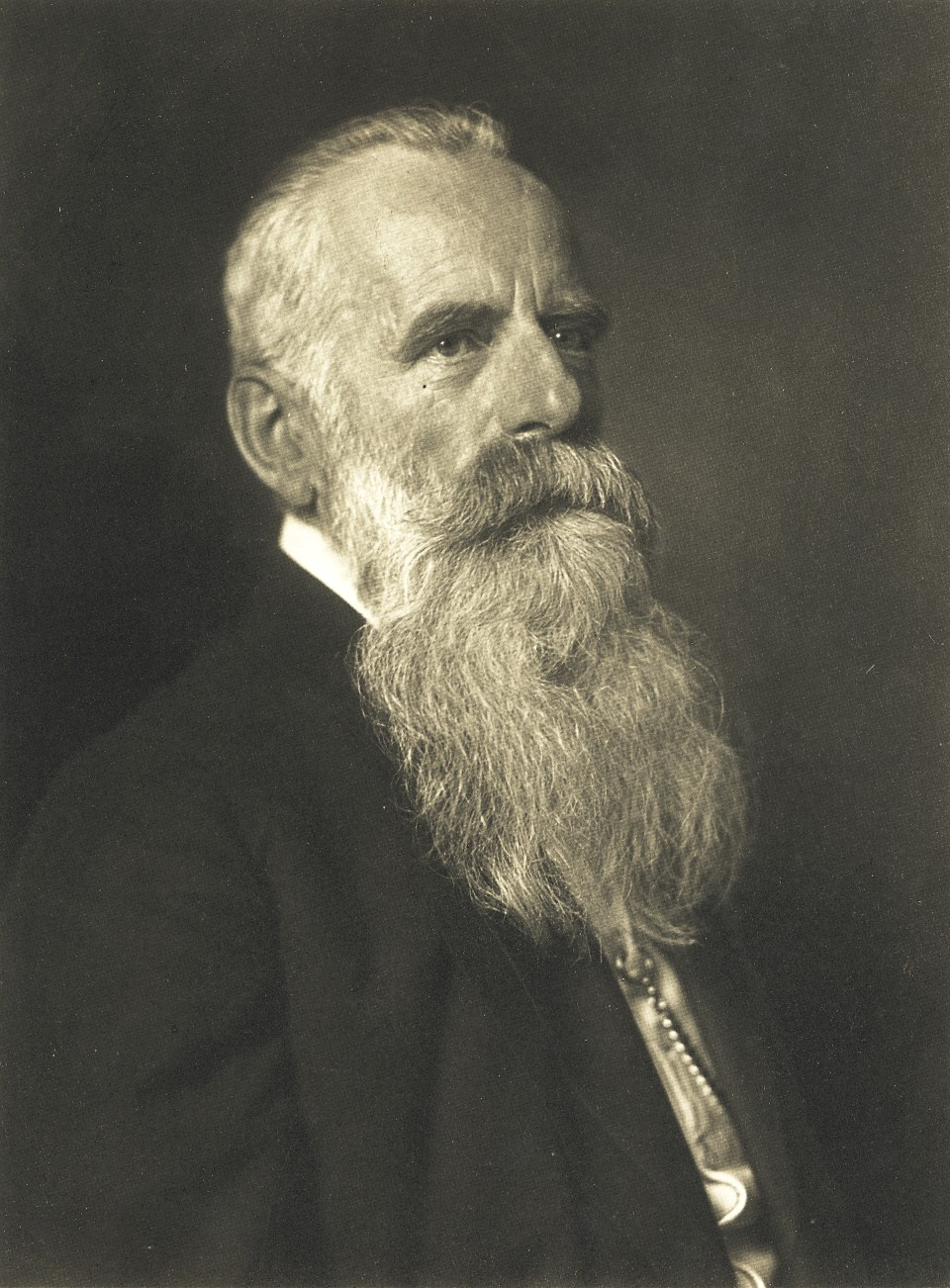
Nominee	Friedrich Ebert	Arthur von Posadowsky‑Wehner
Party	SPD	DNVP
Electoral vote	277	49
Percentage	84.45%	14.94%
Elected President
Friedrich Ebert
SPD

The 1919 German presidential election (Reichspräsidentenwahl) was the first election to the office of President of the Reich (Reichspräsident), Germany's head of state during the 1919−1933 Weimar Republic. The constitution that stipulated a direct popular vote was not completed before 11 August 1919. Because a head of state was needed immediately the 1919 presidential election was held indirectly, by the National Assembly, on 11 February 1919. The winner was SPD chairman Friedrich Ebert, who beat former (Imperial) Secretary of the Interior Arthur von Posadowsky-Wehner in the first round of voting by 277 to 49 votes. Ebert was supported by the SPD, the German Centre Party and the German Democratic Party (DDP), the parties of the "Weimar Coalition", which held more than 77 per cent of the seats in the National Assembly. He became President of Germany, holding the office until his death in 1925.

With the subsequent 1925 and 1932 German presidential elections held with direct universal suffrage, this election would be the sole indirect presidential election held until the end of World War II. Further, Ebert would also remain the sole Social Democrat elected President of Germany until the election of Gustav Heinemann in 1969, and the only socialist to serve in that position between 1919 and the end of the war in 1945.

== Results ==
Candidate (Party)	Supported by	Votes	%
Friedrich Ebert (SPD)	SPD, DDP, Zentrum	277	84.45 %
Arthur Graf von Posadowsky-Wehner (DNVP)	DNVP	49	14.94 %
Philipp Scheidemann (SPD)	N/A	1	0.30 %
Matthias Erzberger (Zentrum)	N/A	1	0.30 %
Valid votes		328	86.54 %
Invalid votes		51	13.46 %
Cast votes		379	100.0 %
Delegates eligible to vote / Turnout		423	89.60 %

== See also ==
- History of Germany
