= Josef Pieper =

German Catholic philosopher (1904–1997)

- Born: 4 May 1904; Elte, German Empire
- Died: 6 November 1997 (aged 93); Münster, Germany

Education
- Education: University of Berlin; University of Münster

Philosophical work
- Era: 20th-century philosophy
- Region: Western philosophy
- School: Thomism; Christian philosophy
- Main interests: Philosophy of religion

Josef Pieper (German: [ˈpiːpɐ]; 4 May 1904 – 6 November 1997) was a German Catholic philosopher and an important figure in the resurgence of interest in the thought of Thomas Aquinas in early-to-mid 20th-century philosophy. Among his most notable works are The Four Cardinal Virtues: Prudence, Justice, Fortitude, Temperance; Leisure, the Basis of Culture; and Guide to Thomas Aquinas (published in England as Introduction to Thomas Aquinas).

== Life and career ==
Pieper studied philosophy, law, and sociology at the universities of Berlin and Münster. After working as a sociologist and freelance writer, he became ordinary professor of philosophical anthropology at the University of Münster, and taught there from 1950 to 1976. As professor emeritus, he continued to provide lectures until 1996.

With his wife Hildegard, Pieper translated C.S. Lewis's The Problem of Pain into German (Über den Schmerz, 1954) with an afterword, "On Simplicity of Language in Philosophy". A symposium to celebrate his 90th birthday was held in Münster in May 1994, with the papers read there published as Aufklärung durch Tradition ("Enlightenment through Tradition") in 1995. In 2010, a symposium was held in Paderborn on "Josef Pieper's and C. S. Lewis's View of Man", with papers published in Wahrheit und Selbstüberschreitung ("Truth and Self-Transcendence").

== Philosophy ==
His views are rooted primarily in the Scholasticism of Thomas Aquinas and in the teachings of Plato. In 60 years of creative work as a philosopher and writer, Pieper explicated the wisdom tradition of the West in clear language, and identified its enduring relevance.

== Legacy ==
Recent champions of Pieper's philosophy in the English-speaking world include James V. Schall, S.J., professor of political philosophy at Georgetown University, Joseph T. Lienhard, S.J., professor of theology at Fordham University, Steven Cortright at St. Mary's College of California, Francis Grabowski, professor of English at Rogers State University, and from within the Muslim community, Hamza Yusuf of Zaytuna College, Berkeley, California.

In his autobiography, Pieper wrote:

"I was not in Germany when the Nazis took over. I had cast my vote against it early on the morning of 3 March 1933 in the polling of the Central Railway Station in Munich, before traveling south with my fiancée and her friend."

The philosopher Kurt Flasch sees Pieper's 1934 writing as support for Nazi social policy; however, Flasch qualifies that Pieper's attempts to act as a "bridge builder" between Catholicism and the Nazi state are visible "only in his world of thought of the years 1933 and 1934". In the early phase of the Nazi regime, Pieper "[clarified] the ethically correct intention of National Socialism and ... explained to hesitant Catholics the parallel social teaching of the encyclical Quadragesimo of 1929" and thus at his place of work in Münster in community with the aforementioned scholars served to "talk the Münster Catholics out of their distance from National Socialism". Pieper agreed with Schmaus and Lortz that "Hitler and the Pope ... had the same main enemies", namely "liberalism on the right, this hereditary evil of modernity which underlies the current crisis, and Bolshevism on the left, before Hitler saved us". "He, Pieper, proves to the Catholic Christians that Hitler's and the Pope's goals are identical." Pieper's book, Das Arbeitsrecht des Neuen Reiches und die Enzyklika Quadragesimo anno ("The Labor Law of the New Reich and the Encyclical Quadragesimo Anno") (1934), says: "The very far-reaching, in individual points astonishing correspondences between the model of the encyclical and the socio-political goals and realizations of the National Socialist state should be clarified so emphatically, so that the Catholic Christians outside the bridge that connects the ideas of Christian social teaching with National Socialist social policy, the core of the domestic policy of the Third Reich." Hans Maier wrote in a review that Flasch, in his writing on Pieper, refutes the assumption that Pieper was a "pioneer of National Socialism". Pieper gave the Third Reich "no impetus, no suggestions", but was initially deceived by Nazi attempts to hide the criminal character of that state.

However, immediately after the publication of the book Das Arbeitsrecht des Neuen Reiches und die Enzyklika Quadragesimo, Pieper recognized his mistake and asked the publisher on 21 July 1934 and again on 22 September 22, to refrain from a new edition. According to Hans Maier, Pieper quickly distanced himself from Das Arbeitsrecht and his positive assessment of Nazi social policy. In his work on the cardinal virtue of bravery, also published in 1934, Pieper, referring to the situation in Germany, was already warning of a "destructive counterattack of ... irrationalism" that "declares war on the primacy of ... the Spirit itself." Pieper also criticized the "conversion of society into a community" operated by the Nazis. Because of the increasingly visible rejection of Nazism in his writings, Pieper was eventually banned from publishing. The philosopher Fernando Inciarte therefore classifies Pieper as an opponent of National Socialism, who, however, did not cross the line into open resistance and therefore "never claimed the honor of being considered an opposition member". However, Pieper's writings have been shown to have influenced members of the opposition such as Dietrich Bonhoeffer.

== Awards ==
In 1981 Pieper received the Balzan Prize in Philosophy; in 1987 he was awarded the State Prize of the state of Nordrhein-Westfalen. In 1990, he received the Ehrenring of the Görres-Gesellschaft.

== Select publications in English ==
- Leisure, the Basis of Culture. Translated by Alexander Dru. With an introduction by T. S. Eliot. London: Faber and Faber, 1952. (Originally Muße und Kult. München:Kösel-Verlag, 1948). New translation by Gerald Malsbary. South Bend: St. Augustine's Press, 1998. ISBN 1-890318-35-3.
- The End of Time: A Meditation on the Philosophy of History. Translated by Michael Bullock. New York:Pantheon Books, 1954. (Originally Uber das Ende der Zeit). Reprinted New York: Octagon Books, 1982. ISBN 0-374-96447-5. Reprinted San Francisco: Ignatius Press, 1999. ISBN 0-89870-726-9.
- The Silence of St. Thomas. Translated by Daniel O'Connor. London: Faber & Faber, 1957. ISBN 1-890318-78-7.
- Happiness and Contemplation. Translated by Richard and Clara Winston. New York: Pantheon, 1958. Reprinted, with an introduction by Ralph McInerny. South Bend: St. Augustine's Press, 1998. ISBN 1-890318-31-0.
- The Four Cardinal Virtues: Prudence, Justice, Fortitude, Temperance. Notre Dame, Ind., 1966. ISBN 978-0-268-00103-2. Translations originally published separately, Fortitude and Temperance translated by Daniel F. Coogan (1954); Justice translated by Lawrence E. Lynch (1955); and Prudence translated by Richard and Clara Winston (1959).
- Scholasticism: Personalities and Problems of Medieval Philosophy. Translated by Richard and Clara Winston. New York: Pantheon Press, 1960. Reissued South Bend: St. Augustine's Press, 2001. ISBN 1-58731-750-8.
- Guide to Thomas Aquinas. Translated by Richard and Clara Winston. New York: Pantheon Books, 1962. (Originally Hinführung zu Thomas von Aquin.) Publication in England as Introduction to Thomas Aquinas. London: Faber and Faber, 1962. Reissued San Francisco: Ignatius Press, 1991. ISBN 0-89870-319-0
- Enthusiasm and Divine Madness. Translated by Richard and Clara Winston. New York: Harcourt, Brace & World, 1964. (Originally Begeisterung und Göttlicher Wahnsinn). Reissued South Bend: St. Augustine's Press, 2000. ISBN 1-890318-23-X
- In Tune with the World: A Theory of Festivity. Translated by Richard and Clara Winston. New York: Harcourt, Brace and World, 1965. (Originally Zustimmung zur Welt). Reissued South Bend: St. Augustine's Press, 1999. ISBN 1-890318-33-7
- Death and Immortality. Translated by Richard and Clara Winston. New York: Herder & Herder; London: Burns & Oates, 1969. (Originally Tod und Unsterblichkeit. Munich: Kösel-Verlag, 1968.). Reissued South Bend: St. Augustine's Press, 2000. ISBN 1-890318-18-3
- Hope and History. Translated by Richard and Clara Winston. New York: Herder & Herder; London: Burns & Oates, 1969. ISBN 0-223-97699-7.
- On Hope. Translated by Mary Frances McCarthy. (Originally Über die Hoffnung). San Francisco: Ignatius Press, 1986. ISBN 0-89870-067-1.
- What is a Feast? Waterloo: North Waterloo Academic Press, 1987. ISBN 0-921075-04-9.
- No One Could Have Known: An Autobiography – the Early Years 1904-1945. Translated by Graham Harrison. (Originally Noch wusste es Niemand). San Francisco: Ignatius Press, 1987. ISBN 0-89870-131-7.
- In Defense of Philosophy: Classical wisdom stands up to modern challenges. Translated by Lothar Krauth. San Francisco: Ignatius Press, 1992. ISBN 0-89870-397-2 (Originally Verteidigungsrede für die Philosophie. Munich: Kösel-Verlag, 1966).
- Only the Lover Sings: Art and Contemplation. Translated by Lothar Krauth. San Francisco: Ignatius Press, 1990. ISBN 0-89870-302-6 (Originally Nur der Liebende Singt, 1988).
- In Search of the Sacred: Contributions to An Answer, San Francisco: Ignatius Press, 1991. ISBN 978-0-89870-301-6
- Josef Pieper: An Anthology, San Francisco: Ignatius Press, 1989. A translation of Josef Pieper: Lesebuch; second edition, Munich: Kösel-Verlag, 1984. First edition 1981. ISBN 978-0-89870-226-2
- The Concept of Sin (2001), translated by Edward T. Oakes SJ (originally: Über den Begriff der Sünde, Munich 1977), South Bend, Indiana: St. Augustine's Press. ISBN 1-890318-08-6
- Abuse Of Language, Abuse Of Power. San Francisco: Ignatius Press, 1992. ISBN 0-89870-362-X
- Leisure, the Basis of Culture and The Philosophical Act. Translated by Alexander Dru. With an introduction by James V. Schall, SJ. San Francisco: Ignatius Press, 2009. 143pp. ISBN 978-1-58617-256-5
- Tradition: Concept and Claim. Translated by E. Christian Kopff, St. Augustine Press, 2010.
- The Christian Idea of Man. Translated by Dan Farrelly. South Bend, Indiana: St. Augustine's Press, 2011. ISBN 978-1-58731-112-3. (Originally "Über das christliche Menschenbild". Munich: Kösel-Verlag).
- Not Yet the Twilight: An Autobiography: 1945-1964. South Bend, Indiana: St. Augustine's Press, 2017. ISBN 978-1587315763
- A Journey to Point Omega: Autobiography from 1964. Translated by Dan Farrelly. South Bend, Indiana: St. Augustine's Press, 2020. ISBN 978-1587314056
