= Gerhard Schröder (CDU) =

German politician (1910–1989)

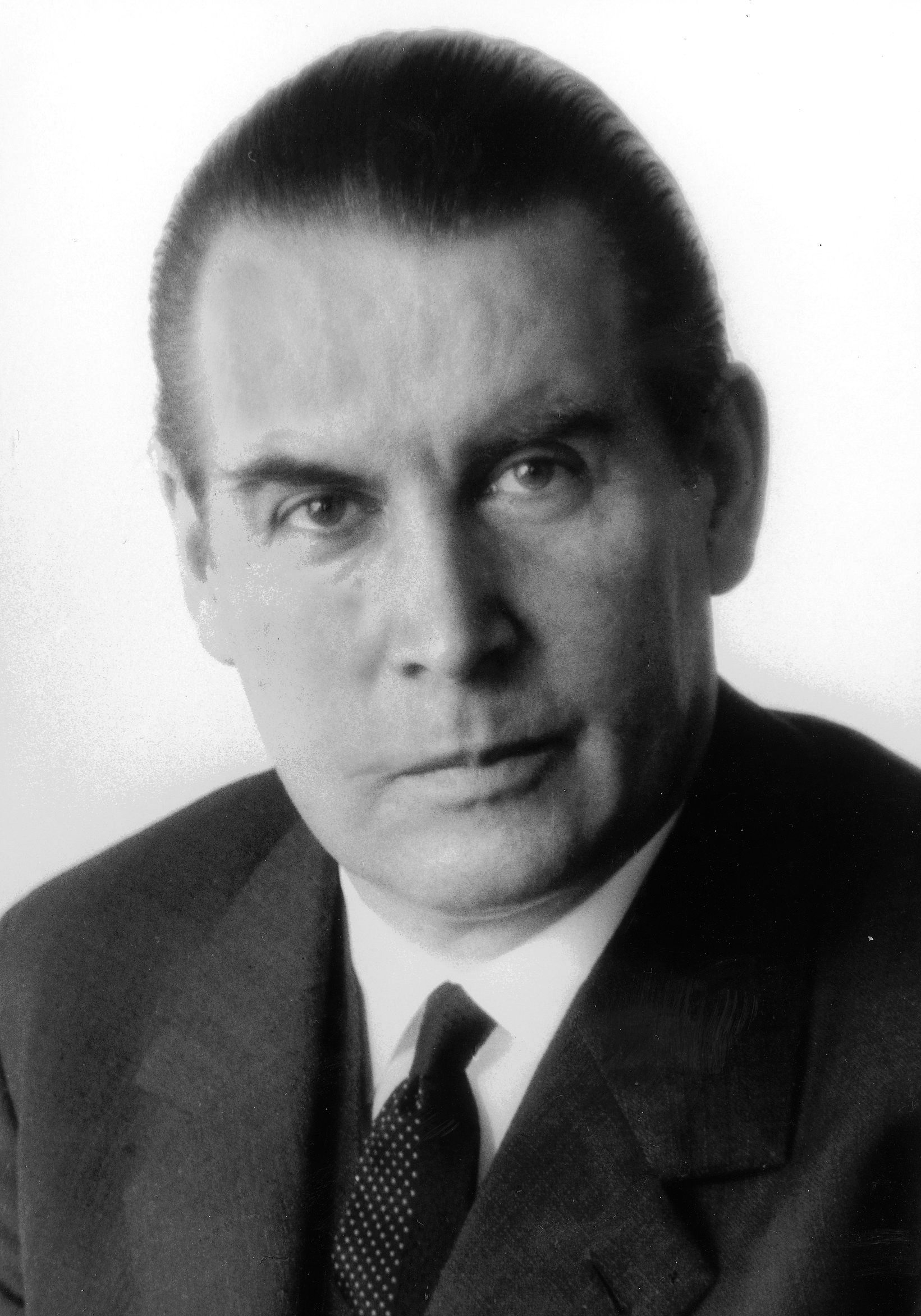
- Schröder in 1966

Minister of Defence (West Germany)
- In office 1 December 1966 – 21 October 1969
- Chancellor: Kurt Georg Kiesinger
- Preceded by: Kai-Uwe von Hassel
- Succeeded by: Helmut Schmidt

Minister of Foreign Affairs (West Germany)
- In office 14 November 1961 – 30 November 1966
- Chancellor: Konrad Adenauer; Ludwig Erhard
- Preceded by: Heinrich von Brentano
- Succeeded by: Willy Brandt

Minister of the Interior (West Germany)
- In office 20 October 1953 – 13 November 1961
- Chancellor: Konrad Adenauer
- Preceded by: Robert Lehr
- Succeeded by: Hermann Höcherl

Deputy Chair of the CDU/CSU in the German Bundestag
- In office 24 June 1952 – 20 October 1953

Member of the German Bundestag
- In office 7 September 1949 – 4 November 1980

Personal details
- Born: 11 September 1910 Saarbrücken, Kingdom of Prussia, German Empire
- Died: 31 December 1989 (aged 79) Kampen (Sylt), West Germany
- Party: Nazi Party (1933–1941); Christian Democratic Union (1945–1989)
- Education: University of Bonn; University of Edinburgh

Gerhard Schröder (11 September 1910 – 31 December 1989) was a West German politician and member of the Christian Democratic Union (CDU) party. He served as Federal Minister of the Interior from 1953 to 1961, as Foreign Minister from 1961 to 1966, and as Minister of Defence from 1966 until 1969. In the 1969 election he ran for President of the Federal Republic of Germany (West Germany) but was outpolled by Gustav Heinemann.

== Life ==
The son of a railway official, Schröder was born in Saarbrücken, then part of the Prussian Rhine Province. Having passed his Abitur exams, he went on to study law at the University of Königsberg and two semesters abroad at the University of Edinburgh, where he, according to his own accounts, became familiar with a British way of life. In 1932 he finished his studies in Bonn he had committed himself to the university group of the national liberal German People's Party.

Schröder passed the first and second Staatsexamen in 1932 and 1936. Having obtained his doctorate in 1934 he worked as a consultant at the Kaiser Wilhelm Society in Berlin. Still as a referendary in Bonn, he had joined the Nazi Party on 1 April 1933 and also the SA. He continued his career as a law firm employee and in 1939 obtained an attorney's certificate and worked as a tax lawyer. He left the NSDAP in May 1941 (a rather rare occurrence). In the same month and perhaps in connection, he married his wife, Brigitte Schröder née Landsberg, needing - she was half-Jewish - with an extraordinary permission by his Armed Forces superiors.

He held federal office as Minister of the Interior (1953–1961) and as Minister of Foreign Affairs (1961–1966) in the cabinets of Chancellor Konrad Adenauer and of Ludwig Erhard. From 1966 to 1969 he served as Minister of Defence under Chancellor Kurt Georg Kiesinger.

In 1969 Gerhard Schröder ran for the Office of the Federal President (supported by CDU and NPD), but he was beaten by Gustav Heinemann, the nominee of the SPD (supported by FDP), at the third ballot with 49.4% to 48.8% of the votes of the Federal Assembly.

In the years following his active political activity, Schröder maintained a private discussion circle of former politicians, diplomats and economic officials who philosophized about the global problems of the new era but no longer intervened politically in day-to-day business. He supported the Reagan administration and endorsed the SDI program.

His last appearance in the Bundestag was on 17 June 1984, when he held the ceremonial address of the commemoration ceremony of the June 1953 bloody uprising.

Schröder died on 31 December 1989 in his house on Sylt. After his death, the German Bundestag honored him on 12 January 1990 with a state act in the plenary hall. Gerhard Schröder was buried in the cemetery of the island church of St. Severin in Keitum, Sylt.

== Decorations and awards ==
- Iron Cross, 2nd class (1942)
- Black Wound Badge (1942)
- Eastern Front Medal (1942)
- Cholm Shield (1942) - awarded to German soldiers who participated in the defence of the occupied Soviet city of Kholm
- Grand Decoration of Honour in Gold with Sash for Services to the Republic of Austria (Großes Goldenes Ehrenzeichen am Bande) (1962)
- Grand Cross of the Order of Merit of the Italian Republic (8 August 1965) (with Willy Brandt)
- Grand Cross of the Order of Isabella the Catholic (1966)

Political offices
Preceded by Robert Lehr	Minister of the Interior; 1953–1961	Succeeded by Hermann Höcherl
Preceded by Heinrich von Brentano di Tremezzo	Minister of Foreign Affairs; 1961–1966	Succeeded by Willy Brandt
Preceded by Kai-Uwe von Hassel	Minister of Defence; 1966–1969	Succeeded by Helmut Schmidt
