= Schmaus =

Schmaus is a German last name that can refer to the following people:

- Willibald Schmaus, Austrian football player
- Michael Schmaus, German Roman Catholic theologian
