= Brigitte Schröder =

German politician and volunteer (2017–2000)

Brigitte Schröder (née Landsberg; born July 28, 1917, in Breslau; died October 27, 2000, in Bonn) was a German politician and volunteer in the church and social sector. She had been the wife of the German politician Gerhard Schröder since 1941.

According to the Nuremberg Laws, she was considered a "mongrel of the first degree". The wedding was therefore only possible with an exemption permit from the Wehrmacht. Surprisingly, this was issued even though Gerhard Schröder had left the NSDAP in the same year.

Brigitte Schröder was active in many honorary functions. She was a member of the city council of Düsseldorf for 13 years, was also a presbyter in the Matthäi parish there and founded the working group of Protestant parents and educators. After moving to Bonn in 1962, she founded the Women's and Family Service of the Foreign Office.

In 1969, she founded the Evangelische Kranken- und Altenhilfe (eKH), which she led for 27 years until she handed over the reins to Gabriele Trull in 1996. Today, over 11,000 "Green Ladies and Gentlemen" work at the eKH.

For her services, Brigitte Schröder was made an honorary member of the Order of St. John in 1985. In 1993, she received the Order of Merit of North Rhine-Westphalia.

== Literature ==
- Norbert Friedrich: Brigitte Schröder. A diaconal-evangelical personality. In: Siegfried Hermle, Thomas Martin Schneider (eds.): Protestant Impulse. Formative figures in Germany after 1945 (= Christentum und Zeitgeschichte. Volume 8). Evangelische Verlagsanstalt, Leipzig 2021, ISBN 978-3-374-06889-0, pp. 141–148.
- Ebba Hagenberg-Miliu: Brigitte Schröder. Germany's "First Green Lady" Evangelische Verlags-Anstalt, Leipzig 2003, ISBN 3-374-02043-7.
