= Robert Lehr =

German politician (1883–1956)

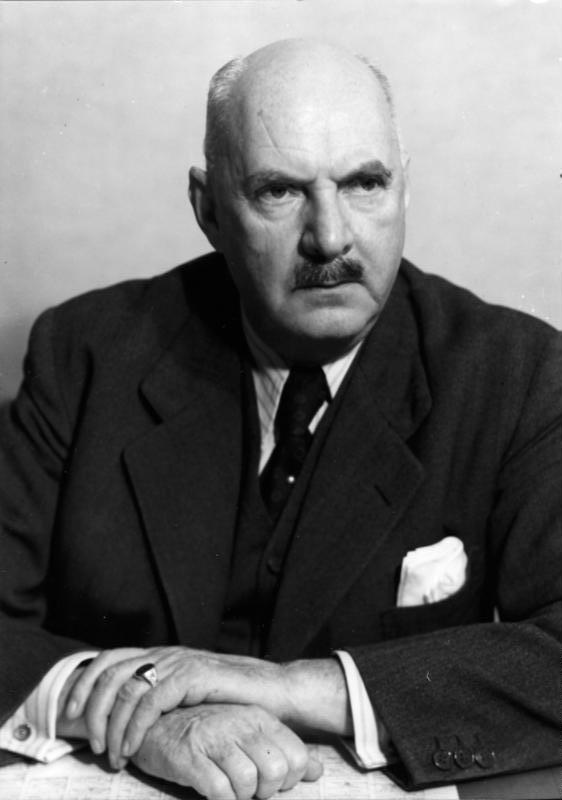
- Lehr in 1950

Federal Minister of the Interior
- In office 11 October 1950 – 20 October 1953
- Chancellor: Konrad Adenauer
- Preceded by: Gustav Heinemann
- Succeeded by: Gerhard Schröder

Member of the Bundestag
- In office 7 September 1949 – 7 September 1953

Personal details
- Born: 20 August 1883 Celle, Hanover, Prussia, German Empire
- Died: 13 October 1956 (aged 73) Düsseldorf, North Rhine-Westphalia, West Germany
- Party: Christian Democratic Union of Germany (CDU) (1945–1956)
- Other political affiliations: German National People's Party (DNVP) (1929–1933)
- Education: University of Marburg; University of Berlin; University of Bonn
- Occupation: Lawyer

Robert Lehr (20 August 1883 – 13 October 1956) was a German politician (DNVP, CDU). He served as Federal Minister of the Interior from 1950 to 1953 under chancellor Konrad Adenauer.

== Early life and education ==
Robert Lehr was born on 20 August 1883 in Celle as the third child of Oskar and Clara (Stück) Lehr. His childhood was shaped by his father's involvement in the military as well as his parents' Protestant Pietistic beliefs.

Lehr completed his Abitur in 1904 and began studying jurisprudence in Marburg, Berlin, and Bonn. In 1907 he passed his first Staatsexamen in Cologne and received his doctorate from the University of Heidelberg in 1908 with a dissertation on legal liability laws within the German Reich. After completing his referendary and final Staatsexamen Lehr decided to pursue a career in local administration because of the personal autonomy and variety such a position offered. He began working as an assessor for the municipality of Düsseldorf in 1913

== Early career ==
In December 1914 at the age of 31, Lehr was elected department head of the police, in which role he was responsible for controlling the press, surveying food supply, counterespionage, and combating radical forces. He held this position throughout World War I. He moved to a position as head of the finance department in 1919 and worked there until 1924, when he was elected ’’Oberbürgermeister’’ of Düsseldorf. During this time he was able to foster economic success within his city despite the worsening economic conditions in nearby Cologne.

== Nazi-era ==
=== Arrest ===
During a board meeting on 12 April 1933, only weeks after the Enabling Act (‘’Ermächtigungsgesetz’’), ‘’Oberbürgermeister’’ Lehr was arrested on charges of bribery and personal gain. Just before this, Lehr refused to fly the swastika flag at the Düsseldorf city hall which some have stated led to this arrest. He was released from “protective custody” in September 1933 due to a severe sickness. He remained barred from working as a lawyer or professor within Nazi Germany, and remained a private citizen throughout the remainder of the Nazi rule.

=== Resistance ===
In 1935, Lehr joined a Düsseldorf resistance group consisting of multiple prominent individuals of the Weimar Era including former Union Secretary Karl Arnold and evangelical lawyer Franz Etzel. The Düsseldorf resistance was connected with multiple other resistance groups throughout the nation, including those led by Jakob Kaiser in Berlin and Heinrich Körner in Bonn. Lehr and his wife remained under intense scrutiny by the Gestapo until the end of World War II.

== Post-war ==
Lehr returned to politics immediately following the war, helping to establish the CDU in 1945. Immediately following World War II, Lehr was appointed by the British military government to reorganize the administration of the North Rhine province. He focused heavily on securing food supplies for the starving population in the industrial Ruhr region. In 1948 as a member of the Parliamentary Council (Parlamentarischer Rat) which drafted the West German constitution, he famously proposed a different flag design that looked like the US flag, but with German colors (black, red, and gold). He was named the governor of the North Rhine-Westphalia province by occupying British troops. He belonged to the German Bundestag from 1949 until 1953.

Lehr remained active in other areas of society as well, serving as President of the ‘’Schutzgemeinschaft Deutscher Wald’’, an environmental association, from 1947 until 1956 and acting as the head of the ‘’Marburger Universitätsbund’’ from 1952 until his death. He also served as President of the ‘’Industrial Club of Düsseldorf’’ during this time.

Lehr died on 13 October 1956 at the age of 73 in Düsseldorf.
