= Elisabeth Gössmann =

German catholic theologian (1928–2019)

Maria Elisabeth Gössmann née Placke (21 June 1928, Osnabrück; — 1 May 2019, Munich) was a German Roman Catholic theologian and prominent representative of feminist theology within the Roman Catholic Church. She saw herself as a representative of "historical women's studies in theology".

== Life ==
After leaving school in 1947, Elisabeth Gössmann studied Catholic theology, philosophy and German studies at the University of Münster and passed her state examination in 1952. She studied under Michael Schmaus at Ludwig-Maximilians-Universität München. She was more interested in "the alternative", namely the theological drafts of early scholasticism and more in the Franciscan than the Dominican line. She received her doctorate there in 1954 (at the same time as her fellow students Joseph Ratzinger and Uta Ranke-Heinemann). Until 1954, there had been no doctorate in Catholic theology for women in Germany.

She initially worked in Japan, first as a lecturer in medieval German literature at the ecclesiastical Sophia University in Tokyo, then as a lecturer in Christian philosophy at the Society of the Sacred Heart of Jesus (Japanese: Seishinkai) Seishin Women's University. She has taught there as a professor of Japanese since 1968. She has held teaching positions in Germany, Austria and Switzerland since 1986.

Her first attempt at habilitation failed in 1963 due to an objection from the German Bishops' Conference: Laity should not be made professors. In 1978, she succeeded in her second attempt at a habilitation, this time in philosophy under Eugen Biser. However, despite applying 37 times, she was not awarded a chair in Germany and was only able to take up an adjunct professorship in Munich in 1990.

She was married to the literary scholar Wilhelm Gössmann from 1954 until his death in January 2019 and had two daughters and two grandchildren. Elisabeth Gössmann died in Munich at the beginning of May 2019 at the age of 90 after a long illness.

== Books ==
- Maria Elisabeth Gössmann (geborene Placke): Die Verkündigung an Maria im dogmatischen Verständnis des Mittelalters. Hueber, Munich 1957 (Dissertation, Ludwig-Maximilians-Universität München, 20 June 1957, 303 pages, 8°).
- Metaphysik und Heilsgeschichte. Eine theologische Untersuchung der Summa Halensis (Alexander von Hales) (= Mitteilungen des Grabmann-Instituts der Universität München, Sonderband), Grabmann-Institut zur Erforschung der Mittelalterlichen Theologie und Philosophie, Ludwig-Maximilians-Universität München, Hueber München 1964, OCLC 265029837 (Habilitation Universität München 1964, 423 Seiten, nicht angenommen).
- Elisabeth Gössmann (Hrsg.): Archiv für philosophie- und theologiegeschichtliche Frauenforschung. Mehrere Bände, iudicium München, ab 1984.
- Elisabeth Gössmann (Hrsg.) u. a.: Wörterbuch der feministischen Theologie. 2., vollst. überarb. und grundlegend erw. Aufl., Gütersloh 2002, ISBN 3-579-00285-6.
- Geburtsfehler: weiblich. Lebenserinnerungen einer katholischen Theologin. Iudicium, München 2003, ISBN 3-89129-975-3.
- Elisabeth Gössmann (Hrsg.): Weisheit. Eine schöne Rose auf dem Dornenstrauche (= Archiv für philosophie- und theologiegeschichtliche Frauenforschung, Band 8), München 2004, ISBN 3-89129-008-X.
- Julie Kirchberg (Hrsg.), Judith Könemann (Hrsg.), Martina Blasberg-Kuhnke (Beitrag) u. a.: Frauentraditionen. Mit Elisabeth Gössmann im Gespräch. Ostfildern 2006, ISBN 978-3-7966-1258-9.
- Elisabeth Gössmann (Hrsg.), u. a.: Der Teufel blieb männlich. Kritische Diskussion zur „Bibel in gerechter Sprache". Feministische, historische und systematische Beiträge. Neukirchen-Vluyn 2007, ISBN 978-3-7887-2271-5
