= Johann Frauenlob =

Pseudonym of 1631 encyclopaedia author

Johann Frauenlob (16th or 17th century – 17th century) is the pseudonym of a writer in Baroque who published an encyclopedia of "learned women" in 1631 and described himself on the title page as (their?) "General Notarium."

== Frauenlob's identity ==
It is not clear who is behind the pseudonym Johann Frauenlob.

There is no identity with Heinrich von Meißen, who was also called Heinrich Frauenlob. He lived four centuries before Johann Frauenlob. Nevertheless, the similarity of names has led to confusion. Whether the pseudonym of the baroque Johann Frauenlob intentionally refers to Heinrich von Meißen has not been researched.

Elisabeth Gössmann discusses a possible parallel to the "General Notarium der löblichen Societet der gelehrten Weiber" – as it says on the title page of the Baroque print of Frauenlob's Frauenlexikon – a possible real female learned society, of which Frauenlob may have been the secretary.

Linda Maria Koldau cites the same source in Frauen – Musik – Kultur, according to which Johann Frauenlob may have had a connection to a Coburg professor of Eloquenz, Israel Clauderus, or may have been identical to him. Koldau cites Frauenlob several times and, like Gössmann, has written about the many similar sources that appeared at the time in the course of the Querelle des femmes.

== Frauenlob's lexicon of women ==
Frauenlob's work Die Lobwürdige Gesellschafft der Gelehrten Weiber is a (small) encyclopaedia of women who have distinguished themselves through particular intelligence, knowledge and skill in ancient and modern times. It was published in 1631 at an unknown location and is around 40 pages long; with the exception of the preface, it is paginated. This encyclopedia was published in 2000, together with other historical feminist writings of the 16th–18th centuries, in a annotated reprint of the original by Elisabeth Gössmann.

In his preface, Frauenlob holds up the learned women to the godless, arrogant Maidlin as an example against the sin against God and admonishes the parents to give the girls a good education. Despite his noticeable respect for learned women, he thus shows the ambivalent attitude of his time towards women's achievements.

The exceptional nature of women's scholarship is thus neither rejected nor are these people discriminated against as no longer feminine, but their praised knowledge and abilities ultimately appear to be merely the continuation of an education of women that protects them from folly by presenting them with material for learning

— Elisabeth Gössmann, Eve God's Masterpiece

Although women's skills are not praised for their own sake, a valuable lexicon was created in the process, which today plays a role in feminist research.

No further writings under the pseudonym Frauenlob are known. The lexicon had a second edition in 1633.
