= Eunuchs for the Kingdom of Heaven =

1988 book by Uta Ranke-Heinemann

- Author: Uta Ranke-Heinemann
- Original title: Eunuchen für das Himmelreich
- Translator: Heinegg, Peter
- Language: German, English, others
- Genre: Nonfiction
- Publisher: Heyne Verlag, Doubleday
- Publication date: 1988, 1990
- Publication place: Germany, US
- ISBN: 3-453-16505-5

Eunuchs for the Kingdom of Heaven – The Catholic Church and Sexuality (original German title; Eunuchen für das Himmelreich – Katholische Kirche und Sexualität) is a philosophical book by the German theologian Uta Ranke-Heinemann, first published in 1988, and translated in 1990. The book is about how sexual morality is governed by celibates in the Catholic Church, which she criticizes as misogynous. While this work represents a late 20th century view, and remains broadly relevant, in some areas material has become dated, as Pope Francis began to address some of the issues raised in this work in the early 21st century.

The book's title comes from the Bible verse in Matthew 19:12, which could be translated as follows: "For there are some eunuchs, which were so born from their mother's womb; and there are some eunuchs, which were made eunuchs of men; and there be eunuchs, which have made themselves eunuchs for the sake of the kingdom of heaven."

== Contents ==
the book is a compendium of feminist grievances with the Catholic Church wherein Ranke-Heinemann takes on church leaders from St. Augustine to Pope John Paul II, accusing them of treating women like second-class citizens and denigrating their sexuality.

=== Themes ===
One of her main themes is what she perceives as the Church's attitude toward pleasure, particularly sexual pleasure. She presents a comprehensive argument that hatred of pleasure pervades Catholicism, and that this poisons Catholic attitudes toward marriage, motherhood, and women. In the author's own words, "During the entire middle ages, the questions of when intercourse was allowed and when not, and self-punishment, was enormously important." Intercourse was banned on all Sundays, all feast days, 20 days before Christmas, 40 days before Easter, often 30 days before Pentecost, and three or more days before receiving Communion. Penance was to be weeks of fasting on only bread and water. Pope Gregory I decreed abstinence should continue until a baby was weaned. Some authorities taught that babies were born physically deformed or mentally defective because the parents conceived them during one of these forbidden periods (page 140).

Ranke-Heinemann fails to distinguish between degrees of authority that attach to the ecclesial pronouncements, and ignores the difference between doctrine and discipline, as in the case of priestly celibacy.

According to Ranke-Heinemann, from June 3, 1916, the official dogma from Rome regarding sex with a condom has been that "marital chastity requires its martyrs."

Ranke-Heinemann, responding during an interview on Swiss television on January 11, 2007, regarding a BBC World report about AIDS in Africa said: "I accuse the last two popes of foisting a deadly deception upon humanity, and demand that the Vatican should fund medical care for all the women of Africa and the world, and offer compensation to them and their families."

The author also criticizes the denial of marriage to people who are "perpetually "sexually impotent. Canon law distinguishes between different types of impotence, such as impotentia coeundi, which is the inability achieve a satisfactory natural erection, and impotentia generandi, which indicates a failure of the sperm to fertilize the female. In the case of impotentia coeundi the possibility of marriage is denied, in the case of impotentia generandi according to the Decree on the Impotence of 1977 which was no progress for paraplegics, some of whom, despite being fertile, may be unable to achieve a satisfactory erection. The author states: "It is inhuman that the church to determine that a woman can not love a man who is unable to copulate due to a degree of injury, and that the couple should therefore live celibate and separate lives until the end of their days."

=== Modern period ===
Note: Chapter numbers are indicated by numbers in brackets (*)

Recent Catholic morality is outlined in (24) Pope John Paul II and sex for pleasure starts with the concept of sensuality and eroticism proposed by the gynaecologist Theodoor Hendrik van de Velde and his Calendar-based contraceptive methods. This leads into (25) the age of birth regulation in the nineteenth and 20th century. Starting with the Malthusian fear of overpopulation and Father Arthur Vermeersch, S.J. who is credited with equating condoms with rape. It moves on to explore the Familiaris consortio of John Paul II and how Papal infallibility tends to limit theological revision. The following topic is (26) abortion and the death of the mother as a fair price for the baptism of a live infant.

The myth that (27) Onan's death was retribution for being "evil in the sight of the Lord" through being unwilling to father a child by coitus interruptus with his widowed sister-in-law was related to masturbation early in the 18th century which was supposed to cause the divine retribution of either deafness, blindness or madness. A related topic (28) is homosexuality which so appalled Paul the Apostle in his Epistle to the Romans. The suggestion is by isolating the clergy from the laity the occasional 'fall from grace might be either avoided (by lack of women) or perhaps overlooked. Moving on to the () moral theology of the 20th century, the ethical foundation of modern moral philosophy is described as "...extremely feeble, since there is nothing like it in the New Testament". Bernhard Häring's sins of immodesty were listed as:

- Looks (both attractiveness and flirting)
- Touches except for the care of the sick
- Conversations involving flirtation
- Reading bad books (erotic literature and pornography]

== Reception ==
In a review in The New York Times, Jason Berry noted, "Ms. Ranke-Heinemann's research is dazzling, but the anger level is so high that it overpowers her voice of reason." He observed, "Ms. Ranke-Heinemann's obsession with misogyny suggests simply that men hated women and that was that." He also wrote that "No other book on the Catholic moral heritage unearths as many spiteful statements about women – from early church fathers, saints and medieval moralists to recent popes", and "Ms. Ranke-Heinemann's focus is on the ways in which the cultural domination of women has been perpetuated by the celibate governing elite of the Catholic Church, which long considered the clerical state purer and superior to that of marriage. Few bishops – the visible members of that elite – espouse that idea today. Indeed, the church's clerical culture is fraught with a variety of psychosexual conflicts. In this country, at least 200, priests or brothers have been reported for sexually abusing children. In civil litigation, the families of victims have received an estimated $300 million from the church and its insurers. Homosexuality is so pronounced that many religious orders and diocesan seminaries require men to pass an HIV test to prove that they do not have the AIDS virus. Yet historically, moral teachings remain the province of celibate males."

Cardinal John O'Connor compared the book to "scrawling dirty words about the church on bathroom walls", while criticizing the publishing house.

Philip Kennedy considers Ms. Ranke-Heinemann's work a comprehensive overview of historical Christian teaching on sexuality, but also states that it was her response to losing her position as theology chair at the University of Cologne.

Celia Wolf-Devine finds the book raises questions about the ethics of ideologically motivated scholarship, and says that Ranke-Heinemann confuses sex with lust, and reads condemnations of lust as condemnations of sexual pleasure. She also finds Ranke-Heinemann's views superficial and her scholarship uneven. "There are no footnotes; references are done in a very confusing manner and some of them are incomplete; and controversial statements sometimes drop out of the sky with no support at all." In actuality, there are footnotes on nearly every page of the book, linked to a bibliography on page 349-50.

The 1991 Penguin Edition included quotes from reviews on the cover, including:

'A savagely witty polemic against the anti-feminism of Catholicism and its sexual pessimism' – The Observer (London)

'A dense academic examination ... Ranke-Heinemann is passionate and easily understandable in explaining her view' – San Francisco Chronicle

'The book is trenchant, rigorously researched, and brilliant with irony and insight' – Glasgow Herald (Scotland)

== Sources ==
- Ranke-Heinemann, Uta. Eunuchs for the kingdom of heaven: Women, sexuality, and the Catholic Church, Doubleday, Garden City, ISBN 0-385-26527-1, 1990, translator Peter Heinegg
