= Michael Schmaus =

German Roman Catholic theologian (1897–1993)

Michael Schmaus (17 July 1897 – 8 December 1993) was a German Catholic theologian specializing in dogmatics.

== Life ==
Schmaus was born in Oberbaar, Bavaria.

He was ordained a priest in 1922 and got his doctorate in Catholic Dogmatic Theology under Martin Grabmann in 1924.

After teaching at the Philosophisch-Theologische Hochschule Freising, at the local seminary and at the Ludwig-Maximilians-Universität München, he was a professor of dogmatic theology at the German-speaking part of the Charles University in Prague (1928–1933) and from 1933 on at the University of Münster.

German philosopher Kurt Flasch considers Schmaus and his fellow faculty members Josef Pieper and Joseph Lortz to be the three theologian "pro-Nazi authors" who felt called to make the Catholic population familiar with the compatibility of Catholicism and National Socialism, in an academic way. In 1934, in his Encounters between Catholic Christianity and National Socialist Weltanschauung (Begegnungen zwischen katholischem Christentum und nationalsozialistischer Weltanschauung), Schmaus commented on the connection between Catholicism and National Socialist ideology as follows: "The tablets of National Socialist standards and those of Catholic imperatives point in the same direction." („Die Tafeln des nationalsozialistischen Sollens und die der katholischen Imperative weisen in dieselbe Wegrichtung.“) In his 1941 work Catholic Dogma (Katholische Dogmatik), he referred to "the Jews" as "servants of sin," for which they had "no feeling whatsoever," and as "children, servants of the devil."

From 1946 until his retirement in 1965, he was professor of Catholic dogmatic theology at the Ludwig-Maximilians-Universität München. Among his students were Joseph Ratzinger - the future Pope Benedict XVI - with whom he associated with his habilitation for Fundamental Theology, also Gerhard Boß, Josef Finkenzeller, Elisabeth Gössmann, Richard Heinzmann, Stephan Otto, Uta Ranke-Heinemann and Leo Scheffczyk.

In 1951 to 1952, Schmaus was rektor of the Ludwig-Maximilians-Universität München.

He was peritus (theological expert) for part of the Second Vatican Council.

In 1954, he founded the Martin-Grabmann-Institute for Rescue in Medieval Theology and Philosophy, in 1955 the scientific journal Münchner Theologische Zeitschrift.

His two works on Catholic dogma are still standard works.

He died in Gauting, Upper Bavaria in 1993 and buried in Munich Waldfriedhof.

== Honours ==
- 1951 Member of the Bavarian Academy of Sciences and Humanities, historic and philosophic section
- 1952 Member of the Pontificia Academia Mariana Internationalis in Rome
- 1952 Member of the Accademia Leonardo Da Vinci Neapel
- 1952 Prelate of Honour of His Holiness
- 1954 Order of Civil Merit of Spain (Commander / Encomienda)
- 1956 Member of the Pontifical Academy of Theology
- 1957 Order of the Phoenix (Greece) (Commander)
- 1959 Bavarian Order of Merit
- 1968 Great Cross of Merit of the Federal Republic of Germany
- 1983 Protonotary apostolic appointed by Pope John Paul II. on 12 November 1983
- 1983 Günther-Klinge-Kulturpreis of the municipality Gauting
- 1984 Bavarian Maximilian Order for Science and Art
- Renaming of the church square in his place of birth Oberbaar to "Prof.-Michael-Schmaus-Platz"

== Works ==
- Die psychologische Trinitätslehre des hl. Augustinus, (Thesis of Dissertation), 1927.
- Der Liber propugnatorius des Thomas Anglicus und die Lehrunterschiede zwischen Thomas Aquinas und Duns Scotus, II: Die trinitarischen Lehrdifferenzen (= Beiträge zur Geschichte der Philosophie und Theologie des Mittelalters, file 29), Münster 1930 (Thesis of Habilitation.).
- Begegnungen zwischen katholischem Christentum und nationalsozialistischer Weltanschauung, 1934.
- Katholische Dogmatik (Catholic Dogma), 3 volumes, 1938–1941
- Dogma (A different work), 6 volumes 1968, ISBN 0 87061 095 3
- Schmaus, Der Glaube der Kirche

== Literature ==
All those cited here are in German.

- Johann Auer (ed.): Theologie in Geschichte und Gegenwart. Michael Schmaus zum sechzigsten Geburtstag dargebracht von seinen Freunden und Schülern, Verlag Zink, Munich 1957.
- Leo Scheffczyk (ed.) (et al.): Wahrheit und Verkündigung. Michael Schmaus zum 70. Geburtstag. Paderborn, Munich, Vienna 1967, two files.
- Peter Kollmannsberger: Die schöpfungstheologische Frage nach dem Personsein des Menschen in den Dogmatiken von Michael Schmaus und Johann Auer. Dissertationsschrift (Universität Passau). Schuch, Weiden 1992; ISBN 3-926931-09-4
- Richard Heinzmann: Zum Verhältnis von Kirche und Theologie nach Michael Schmaus, in: Thomas Prügl, Marianne Schlosser (ed.): Kirchenbild und Spiritualität. Dominikanische Beiträge zur Ekklesiologie und zum kirchlichen Leben im Mittelalter (= Festschrift für Ulrich Horst OP zum 75. Geburtstag). Paderborn, Munich, Vienna, Zurich 2007, ISBN 978-3-506-75651-0, S. 421–435.
- Manfred Eder (1995). "Michael Schmaus". In Bautz, Traugott (ed.). Biographisch-Bibliographisches Kirchenlexikon (BBKL) (in German). Vol. 9. Herzberg: Bautz. cols. 322–327. ISBN 3-88309-058-1.

== Links ==
- Veröffentlichungen von und über Michael Schmaus im Opac der Regesta Imperii
- Literature by and about Michael Schmaus in the German National Library catalogue
