= James V. Schall =

Catholic priest, Jesuit, author, scholar (1928-2019)

The Reverend James V. Schall SJ
- Born: James Vincent Schall; January 20, 1928; Pocahontas, Iowa, U.S.
- Died: April 17, 2019 (aged 91); Los Gatos, California, U.S.
- Occupation: Academic
- Known for: Philosopher, author, professor, priest

James Vincent Schall SJ (January 20, 1928 – April 17, 2019) was an American Jesuit Roman Catholic priest, teacher, writer, and philosopher. He was Professor of Political Philosophy in the Department of Government at Georgetown University. He retired from teaching in December 2012, giving his final lecture on December 7, 2012, at Georgetown; it was entitled "The Final Gladness," and was sponsored by the Tocqueville Forum. has been described as "a reflection on different aspects of lifelong learning" by the National Catholic Register.

== Biography ==
Born in Pocahontas, Iowa, and educated in local public schools, he graduated from Knoxville (Iowa) High School in 1945.

After time in the U.S. Army (1946–47), he joined the Society of Jesus (California Province) in 1948, and then attended Santa Clara University in California. He earned an MA in Philosophy from Gonzaga University in 1955. He earned a PhD in Political Theory from Georgetown University in 1960, and was ordained as a Roman Catholic priest in 1963. In 1964, he earned an M.A. in Sacred Theology from Santa Clara University.

Schall was a member of the faculty of the Institute of Social Sciences, Pontifical Gregorian University, Rome, from 1964 to 1977, and a member of the Government Department, University of San Francisco, from 1968 to 1977. Among the sources for Schall's lectures were Christian Scripture, Aristotle, Plato, Cicero, Augustine, Thomas Aquinas, G.K. Chesterton, and Pope Benedict XVI.

Before retiring, he was a member of the Government Department at Georgetown University since 1977. In 1993, 2004 and 2010, Schall was presented the Edward B. Bunn, SJ, Award for Faculty Excellence by the senior class in the College of Arts and Sciences at Georgetown University.

Schall retired from his position at Georgetown in December 2012 and moved into the Jesuit retirement home in Los Gatos, California (on the same property as the location of his old novitiate) where he continued to write books and articles for publications and websites. He also continued to give presentations to small groups on request.

Schall served as a member of the Pontifical Commission on Justice and Peace, in Rome from 1977 to 1982. He was also a member of the National Council of the Humanities, and a member of the National Endowment for the Humanities from 1984 to 1990.

He wrote more than 30 books and edited or co-edited 8 others. By July 2002, his website listed his authorship of 356 essays, 148 book reviews, and 660 columns, including his monthly column, "Sense and Nonsense," for the Catholic journal Crisis, and his columns in Gilbert! magazine, the Saint Austin Review, and the University Bookman.

Schall was an expert on the thought of G. K. Chesterton; he edited two volumes of Chesterton's collected works and wrote his own volume of essays on the Catholic convert.

Schall was a vigorous supporter of Benedict XVI's critique of western culture which categorizes it as a "dictatorship of relativism". Schall taught that Catholicism is where "Revelation is addressed to reason" and stated that "We are living in a time where the logic of disorder is at work, rejecting systematically the logic of being a human being." Schall stated that the societal re-examination of the definition of the family "is not just an accident," but is the culture "rejecting heavenly answers and replacing them with human answers. A will is leading you, and it says there is something wrong with being human. That goes back to the whole drama of the Fall. C.S. Lewis says the ultimate sin, the ultimate disorder, is to say what is good is bad, what is bad is good." A reporter summed up his statements as "If we [in society] reject the intelligibility and goodness of creation, will we still be able to hear God’s voice calling us to our supernatural end?"

Schall survived a few major illnesses, including one that resulted in the loss of function in one of his eyes. In the summer of 2010 he had a cancerous jawbone and its attached teeth removed and replaced with bone taken from his leg.

== Writings (selection) ==
Books

- Reason, Revelation, and the Foundations of Political Philosophy (Baton Rouge: Louisiana State University Press, 1967) ISBN 0807113034
- Redeeming the Time (New York: Sheed & Ward, 1968) LC 68-13845 ASIN: B0006BUD2I
- Human Dignity and Human Numbers (Staten Island, NY: Alba House, 1971) ISBN 0-8189-0217-5
- Play On: From Games to Celebrations (Philadelphia: Fortress Press, 1971) ISBN 0-8006-0173-4
- The Sixth Paul (Canfield, OH: Alba Books, 1977) ISBN 0-8189-1147-6
- Welcome, number 4,000,000,000! (Canfield, OH: Alba Books, 1977) ISBN 0-8189-1145-X
- The Praise of "Sons of Bitches": On the Worship of God by Fallen Men (Slough, England: St Paul Publications, 1978) ISBN 0-85439-145-2
- Christianity and Life (San Francisco: Ignatius Press, 1981) ISBN 0-89870-004-3
- Christianity and Politics (Boston: St. Paul Editions, 1981) ISBN 0-8198-1407-5
- Church, State, and Society in the Thought of John Paul II (Chicago: Franciscan Herald, 1982) ISBN 0-8199-0838-X
- Liberation Theology (San Francisco: Ignatius Press, 1982) ISBN 0-89870-006-X
- The Politics of Heaven and Hell: Christian Themes from Classical, Medieval, and Modern Political Philosophy (Lanham, MD: University Press of America, 1984) ISBN 0-8191-3992-0
- Unexpected Meditations Late in the XXth Century (Quincy, IL: Franciscan Press, 1985) ISBN 0-8199-0885-1
- Another Sort of Learning (San Francisco: Ignatius Press, 1988) ISBN 0-89870-183-X
- Religion, Wealth, and Poverty (Vancouver, B. C.: Fraser Institute, 1990) ISBN 0-88975-112-9
- What Is God Like?: Philosophers and 'Hereticks' on the Triune God: The Sundry Paths of Orthodoxy from Plato, Augustine, Samuel Johnson, Nietzsche, Camus, and Flannery O'Connor, even unto Charlie Brown and the Wodehouse Clergy (Collegeville, MN: The Liturgical Press/Michael Glazer, 1992) ISBN 0-8146-5020-1
  - An edition of What Is God Like? was published in Manila, P.I., by St. Paul's, 1995. ISBN 971-504-338-0
- Does Catholicism Still Exist? (Staten Island, NY: Alba House, 1994) ISBN 0-8189-0694-4
- Idylls and Rambles: Lighter Christian Essays (San Francisco: Ignatius Press, 1994) ISBN 0-89870-456-1
- At the Limits of Political Philosophy: From "Brilliant Errors" to Things of Uncommon Importance (Washington: The Catholic University of America Press, 1996) ISBN 0-8132-0832-7; paperbound, ISBN 0-8132-0922-6
- Jacques Maritain: The Philosopher in Society (Lanham, MD: Rowman & Littlefield, 1997) ISBN 0-8476-8683-3
- Schall on Chesterton: Timely Essays on Timeless Paradoxes (Washington: The Catholic University of America Press, 2000) ISBN 0-8132-0963-3
- On the Unseriousness of Human Affairs (Wilmington, DE: ISI Books, 2001) ISBN 1-882926-63-3
- Reason, Revelation, and Human Affairs: Selected Writings of James V. Schall, Marc D. Guerra, editor (Lanham, MD: Lexington Books, 2001) ISBN 0-7391-0198-6
- Roman Catholic Political Philosophy (Lanham, MD: Lexington Books, 2006) ISBN 0-7391-1703-3
- Sum Total Of Human Happiness (South Bend, IN: St. Augustine's Press, 2006) ISBN 1-58731-810-5
- The Order of Things (San Francisco: Ignatius Press, 2007) ISBN 1-58617-197-6
- The Regensburg Lecture (South Bend, IN: St. Augustine's Press, 2007) ISBN 1-58731-695-1
- The Life of the Mind: On the Joys and Travails of Thinking (Wilmington, DE: Intercollegiate Studies Institute, 2008) ISBN 1-933859-61-X
- The Mind That Is Catholic: Philosophical & Political Essays (Washington: The Catholic University of America Press, 2008) ISBN 0-8132-1541-2
- The Classical Moment: Selected Essays on Knowledge and Its Pleasures (South Bend, IN: St. Augustine's Press, Dec 15, 2010) ISBN 1-58731-124-0
- The Modern Age (South Bend, IN: St. Augustine's Press, Dec 10, 2010) ISBN 1-58731-510-6
- Reasonable Pleasures: The Strange Coherences of Catholicism (San Francisco: Ignatius Press, 2013) ISBN 978-1-58617-787-4

Pamphlets

- A Journey through Lent (London: The Catholic Truth Society, 1976) 24pp.
- The Catechism of the Catholic Church (Leesburg, VA.: Catholic Home Studies Institute, 1993). 22pp.
- Ethics and Economics (Grand Rapids, MI: Acton Institute, 1998) 40pp. ASIN: B000GT3QW4
- A Student's Guide to Liberal Learning (Wilmington, DE: Intercollegiate Studies Institute, 2000) 66pp. ISBN 1-882926-53-6

Edited with introduction

- The Whole Truth about Man: John Paul II to University Students and Faculties. (Boston: St. Paul Editions, 1981) ISBN 0-8198-8201-1
- Sacred in All Its Forms: John Paul II on Human Life (Boston: St. Paul Editions, 1984) ISBN 0-8198-6845-0
- Essays on Christianity and Political Philosophy. with George Carey. (Lanham, MD: University Press of America, 1984) ISBN 0-8191-4275-1
- Out of Justice, Peace. Pastorals of the German and French Bishops. (San Francisco: Ignatius Press, 1984) ISBN 0-89870-043-4
- G. K. Chesterton, Collected Works, Vol. IV, What's Wrong with the World, etc. (San Francisco: Ignatius Press, 1986) ISBN 0-89870-147-3
- Studies on Religion and Politics. with Jerome J. Hanus. (Lanham, MD: University Press of America, 1986) ISBN 0-8191-5391-5
- On the Intelligibility of Political Philosophy: Essays of Charles N. R. McCoy. with John Schrems. (Washington: The Catholic University of America Press, 1989) ISBN 0-8132-0679-0
- G. K. Chesterton, Collected Works, Vol. XX, Christendom in Dublin, Irish Impressions, the New Jerusalem, etc. (San Francisco: Ignatius Press, 2002) ISBN 0-89870-854-0
