= Anthony Kosnik =

Catholic reverend and theologian

- Born: June 21, 1930; Detroit, Michigan, United States
- Died: September 22, 2017 (aged 87)
- Occupation: Catholic theologian
- Known for: Author of Human Sexuality: New Directions in American Catholic Thought

Anthony Kosnik was a Catholic reverend and theologian who was primarily known for his joint authorship of Human Sexuality: New Directions in American Catholic Thought, a book commissioned by the Catholic Theological Society of America that was subsequently dismissed and then attacked by the Vatican for its progressive conclusions regarding homosexuality and other questions of sexual ethics. Kosnik suffered personally and professionally from the religious backlash to the publication of the book.

== Early life ==
Kosnik was born in Detroit, Michigan, on June 21, 1930, to Anastazy and Angeline Kosnik. He was the 6th of 13 children. The family identified as Polish American and attended a Polish ethnic parish in Detroit. Anastazy Kosnik worked at the Chrysler automotive factory and taught his children how to construct and renovate homes. Kosnik attended high school seminary, completed formal priesthood study in Plymouth, Michigan, was ordained on June 4, 1955, and received a Doctor of Sacred Theology degree from the Angelicum University in Rome in 1960.

== Resignation ==
In 1972, the board of directors of the Catholic Theological Society of America established a committee to complete a study on human sexuality in response to the public perception of Catholic values changing in the United States, specifically attitudes surrounding birth control, divorce, premarital sex, homosexuality, and other issues. The committee named Anthony Kosnik as chairperson. The committee published their findings in the book Human Sexuality in 1977, which detailed their findings and encouraged a more progressive understanding of traditional Catholic social values.

Due to resulting pressure from Catholic Church authorities, Kosnik was forced to resign from his teaching position at SS. Cyril and Methodius Seminary in 1982. Notably, Cardinal Joseph Ratzinger, who later became Pope Benedict XVI, expressed the church's need for Kosnik to address his published dissent. Kosnik ultimately moved out of his seminary home, where he had lived for 40 years, and moved to his parents' previous home in Hamtramck, Michigan.

== After active ministry ==
Kosnik continued to be active in Catholic social justice circles after leaving active ministry, hosting events at his home and participating in the Elephants in the Living Room and Catholics for the Common Good advocacy groups. He died on September 22, 2017, after struggling with various health issues, including a previous cardiac arrest and dementia.

== See also ==
- Social justice
- Christian left
- Catholic Church and politics
