= Uta Ranke-Heinemann =

German theologian and author (1927–2021)

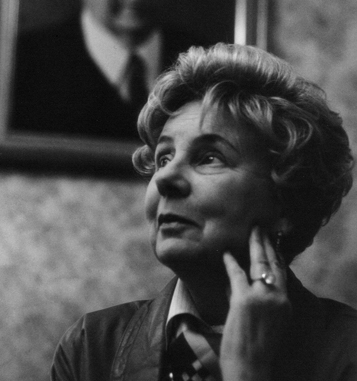
- Born: 2 October 1927; Essen, Germany
- Died: 25 March 2021 (aged 93); Essen, Germany
- Education: Burggymnasium Essen; University of Bonn; University of Basel; University of Oxford; University of Montpellier
- Occupation: Theologian
- Organizations: University of Essen
- Notable work: Eunuchs for the Kingdom of Heaven
- Spouse: Edmund Ranke
- Children: Johannes Ranke-Heinemann
- Father: Gustav Heinemann
- Relatives: Christina Rau (niece)

Uta Ranke-Heinemann (2 October 1927 – 25 March 2021) was a German theologian, academic, and author. In 1969, she was the first woman in the world to be habilitated in Catholic theology. She held a chair of ancient Church history and the New Testament at the University of Essen. When her license to teach was revoked by the bishop because of her critical position in matters of faith, the university created a nondenominational chair of History of Religion. Her 1988 book Eunuchs for the Kingdom of Heaven, criticizing the Catholic Church's stance on women and sexuality, was published in several editions, and translated in 12 languages. Her 1992 book Nein und Amen, revised in 2002, said there were "fairy tales you don't need to believe to have a living faith".

== Life and career ==
Uta Heinemann was born in Essen; her parents were Calvinist Protestants. Her father Gustav Heinemann was to become the third President of the Federal Republic of Germany from 1969 as a first member of the Social Democratic Party of Germany (SPD) in the position. She was an excellent student, the only girl accepted at the Burggymnasium Essen, where she passed the Abitur with distinction.

After nearly seven years' study of Protestant theology at the University of Bonn, the University of Basel, the University of Oxford, and the University of Montpellier, Heinemann converted to Catholicism in 1953, when she married a Catholic religion teacher, Edmund Ranke. The couple had two sons. She was promoted to doctor in 1954 at LMU Munich, making her the first woman to be so (together with Elisabeth Gössmann). One of her fellow students and a friend at that time was Joseph Ratzinger, later known as Pope Benedict XVI.

In 1969, Ranke-Heinemann became the first woman in the world to be habilitated in Catholic theology at LMU Munich. She subsequently held the chair of Ancient Church History and the New Testament at the University of Essen from 1970.

Ranke-Heinemann was active in the peace movement. During the Vietnam War, she supported the ban on napalm bombs. She travelled to the Communist North Vietnam. In 1979, she organized food for Cambodia suffering a famine. She taught from 1980 at the University of Duisburg, and from 1985 at the University of Essen. In 1987, Bishop of Essen Franz Hengsbach withdrew her license to teach Catholic theology for disputing the virgin birth of Jesus. This effectively disqualified her from the post she had held for three years. The University of Essen created a new chair for her, for History of Religion. Her principal book dealing critically with sexuality in the Catholic Church, in English Eunuchs for the Kingdom of Heaven: Women, sexuality, and the Catholic Church, appeared first in 1988, and in many subsequent editions. It was translated to 12 languages.

In 1999, Ranke-Heinemann was a candidate for President of Germany, without party membership, but lost to Johannes Rau, the husband of her niece Christina.

She announced her break with conventional Christianity altogether in 1992. Ranke-Heinemann died at her home in Essen on 25 March 2021 at age 93.

== Beliefs ==
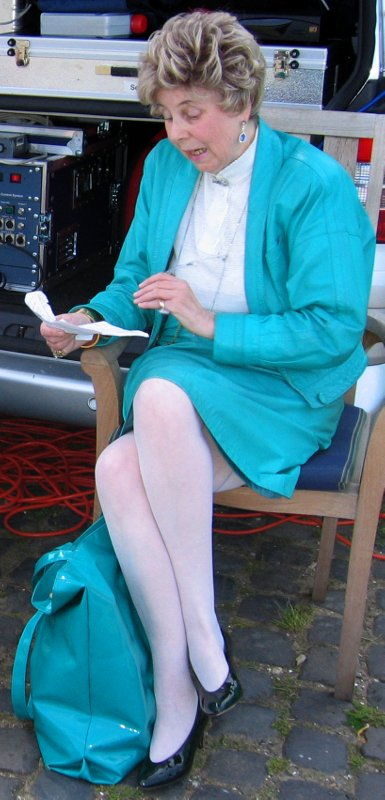
Ranke-Heinemann at the Weltjugendtag in Cologne, 2005

Ranke-Heinemann's book Nein und Amen, announcing her break with the church, was first published in 1992 and reprinted several times; the book was translated into English as Putting Away Childish Things. Spanish and Polish translations followed. She revised it in 2002, after the death of her husband, with the new subtitle Mein Abschied vom traditionellen Christentum, declaring a sevenfold "farewell to traditional Christianity":

1. The Bible is not the word of God but the word of men.
2. That God exists in three persons is the imagination of men.
3. Jesus is man and not God.
4. Mary is the mother of Jesus and not the mother of God.
5. God created heaven and earth, but hell is a product of human imagination.
6. The devil and original sin do not exist.
7. A bloody redemption at the Cross is a pagan sacrificial slaughtering of a human being, based on a model from the religious Stone Age.

She wrote:

Die Erinnerung an Rudolf Bultmann, den Gelehrten voller Hilfsbereitschaft, den Aufgeklärten voller Frömmigkeit, hat mich durch mein Leben begleitet, als bei mir die Zweifel größer wurden. Aber gleichzeitig hat mich sein Beispiel gelehrt, dass auch der Skeptiker ein Christ sein kann, wenn auch nicht auf die herkömmliche Weise. (The memory of Rudolf Bultmann, a scholar full of helpfulness and an enlightened man full of piety, has accompanied me through my life when my doubts grew. But at the same time, his example taught me that even the sceptic can be a Christian, even if not in the conventional way.)

== Works ==
- Ranke-Heinemann, Uta (1958). Weisheit der Wüstenväter. Düsseldorf: Patmos-Verl. OCLC 720087819.
- —— (1962). Der Protestantismus : Wesen und Werden. Essen: Driewer. OCLC 7605032.
- —— (1964). Das frühe Mönchtum, seine Motive nach den Selbstzeugnissen. Essen: H. Driewer. OCLC 7068065.
- —— (1964). Von christlicher Existenz. Essen: Driewer. OCLC 174231966.
- —— (1965). Antwort auf aktuelle Glaubensfragen. Essen: Hans Driewer. OCLC 31344843.
- —— (1968). Christentum für Gläubige und Ungläubige. Essen: Driewer. OCLC 6211617.
- —— (1988). Eunuchen für das Himmelreich kath. Kirche u. Sexualität. Hamburg: Hoffmann u. Campe. ISBN 978-3-455-08281-4. OCLC 243086809.
  Translated into English as:
  —— (1990) [1988]. Eunuchs for the Kingdom of Heaven: Women, sexuality, and the Catholic Church. New York: Doubleday. OCLC 20754536.
  Extended 2012 edition:
  —— (2012). Eunuchen für das Himmelreich : katholische Kirche und Sexualität von Jesus bis Benedikt XVI. Munich: Wilhelm Heyne Verlag. ISBN 978-3-453-16505-2. OCLC 1061549449.
- —— (2002) [1992]. Nein und Amen. Mein Abschied vom traditionellen Christentum (in German). Munich: Heyne. ISBN 3-453-21182-0.
  1992 edition translated as:
  —— (1994) [1992]. Putting away childish things: the Virgin birth, the empty tomb, and other fairy tales you don't need to believe to have a living faith. Translated by Peter Heinegg. San Francisco: Harper. ISBN 0-06-066861-X.
