= Gustav Heinemann =

President of West Germany from 1969 to 1974

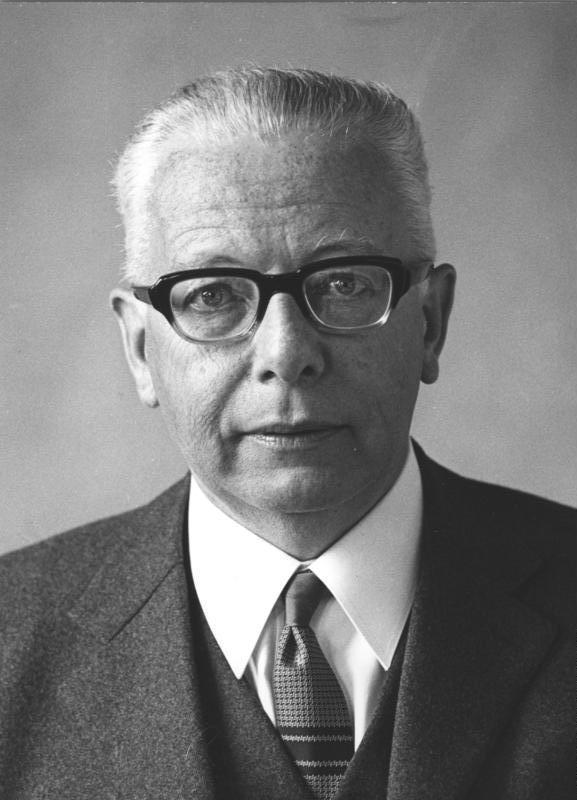
- Heinemann in 1969

President of Germany (Note: Due to the division of Germany, Gustav Heinemann was only the President of West Germany. The term West Germany is the common English name for the Federal Republic of Germany between its formation on 23 May 1949 and the German reunification through the accession of East Germany on 3 October 1990.)
- In office 1 July 1969 – 30 June 1974
- Chancellor: Kurt Georg Kiesinger; Willy Brandt; Helmut Schmidt
- Preceded by: Heinrich Lübke
- Succeeded by: Walter Scheel

Minister of Justice
- In office 1 December 1966 – 26 March 1969
- Chancellor: Kurt Georg Kiesinger
- Preceded by: Richard Jaeger
- Succeeded by: Horst Ehmke

Minister of the Interior
- In office 29 September 1949 – 11 October 1950
- Chancellor: Konrad Adenauer
- Preceded by: Office established
- Succeeded by: Robert Lehr

Member of the Bundestag
- In office 15 October 1957 – 24 June 1969
- Preceded by: Multi-member district
- Succeeded by: Hermann Dortans
- Constituency: Lower Saxony state list (1957–1961); Nienburg – Schaumburg-Lippe (1961–1965); Bochum – Witten (1965–1969)

Mayor of Essen
- In office 30 October 1946 – 19 October 1949
- Preceded by: Heinz Renner
- Succeeded by: Hans Toussaint

Personal details
- Born: Gustav Walter Heinemann; 23 July 1899 Schwelm, Prussia, Germany
- Died: 7 July 1976 (aged 76) Essen, West Germany
- Party: Social Democratic (1957–1976)
- Other political affiliations: CSVD (1930–1933); CDU (1945–1952); GVP (1952–1957)
- Spouse: Hilda Ordemann (m. 1926)
- Children: 4
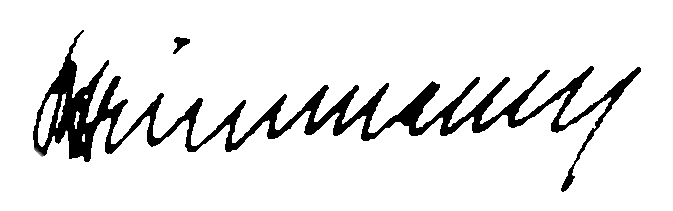
- Signature

Gustav Walter Heinemann (German: [ˈɡʊsta(ː)f ˈhaɪnəman]; 23 July 1899 – 7 July 1976) was a German politician who was President of West Germany from 1969 to 1974. He served as mayor of Essen from 1946 to 1949, West German Minister of the Interior from 1949 to 1950, and Minister of Justice from 1966 to 1969.

== Early years and professional career ==
Heinemann was named after his mother's father, a master roof tiler in Barmen, with radical-democratic, left-liberal, and patriotic views. His maternal grandfather, Heinemann's great-grandfather, had taken part in the Revolution of 1848. His father, Otto Heinemann, a manager at the Krupp steelworks in Essen, shared his father-in-law's views. In his youth, Gustav already felt called upon to preserve and promote the liberal and democratic traditions of 1848. Throughout his life, he fought against all kinds of subservience. This attitude helped him to maintain his intellectual independence even in the face of majorities in political parties and in the Church.

Having finished his elite secondary education in 1917, Heinemann briefly became a soldier in the World War I, but his severe illness stopped him from being sent to the front.

From 1918, Heinemann studied law, economics, and history at the universities of Münster, Marburg, Munich, Göttingen, and Berlin, graduating in 1922 and passing the bar in 1926. He received a PhD in 1922 and a doctorate of law in 1929. The friendships that Heinemann formed during his student years often lasted for a lifetime. Among his friends were such different people as Wilhelm Röpke, who was to become one of the leading figures of economic liberalism, Ernst Lemmer, later a trade unionist and also a Christian Democrat, and Viktor Agartz, a Marxist.

At the beginning of his career, Heinemann joined a renowned firm of solicitors in Essen. In 1929, he published a book about legal questions in the medical profession. From 1929 to 1949, he worked as a legal adviser to the Rheinische Stahlwerke in Essen, and from 1936 to 1949, he was also one of its directors.

The steelworks were considered to be essential for the war so Heinemann was not drafted into the army. He was a lecturer at the law school of the University of Cologne between 1933 and 1939. It was probably his refusal to become a member of the Nazi Party that ended his academic career. Heinemann was invited to join the board of directors of the Rheinisch-Westfälische Kohlensyndikat (Rhenish-Westphalian Coal Syndicate) in 1936, but the invitation was withdrawn due to Heinemann's refusal to end his work for the anti-Nazi Confessing Church.

== Family and religion ==
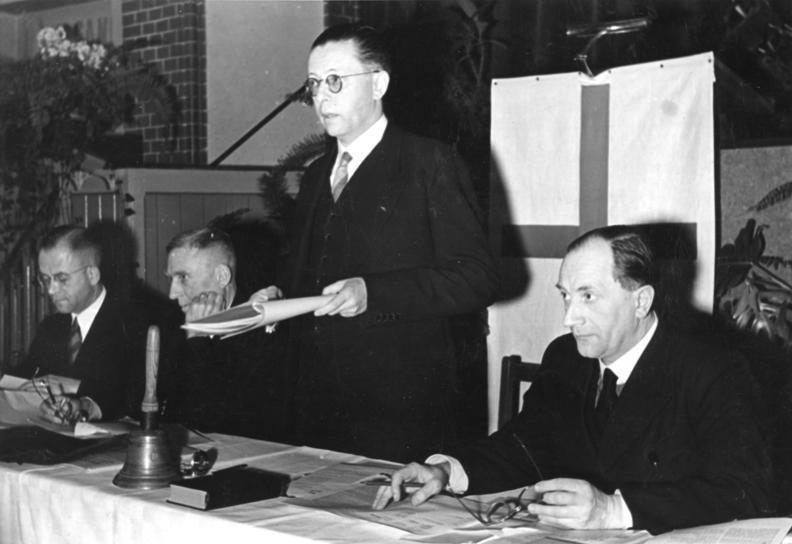
Heinemann, at the general synod of the Protestant Church in Germany, 1949

In 1926, Heinemann married Hilda Ordemann (1896–1979), who had been a student of Rudolf Bultmann, the famous Protestant theologian. His wife and the minister of his wife's parish, Wilhelm Graeber, led Heinemann back to Christianity from which he had become estranged. Through his sister-in-law, he became acquainted with Swiss theologian Karl Barth, who strongly influenced him such as in his condemnation of nationalism and antisemitism.

Gustav and Hilda Heinemann had three daughters, Uta (later Uta Ranke-Heinemann), Christa (mother of Christina Rau, former federal president Johannes Rau's wife) and Barbara; they also had a son, Peter.

Heinemann was an elder (Presbyter) in Wilhelm Graeber's parish in Essen when Graeber was sacked in 1933 by the new church authorities who co-operated with the Nazis. Opposition against those German Christians came from the Confessing Church, and Heinemann became a member of its synod and its legal adviser. As he disagreed with some of the developments within the Confessing Church, he withdrew from the church leadership in 1939, but he continued as an elder in his parish, in whose capacity he gave legal advice to persecuted fellow Christians and helped Jews who had gone into hiding by providing them with food.

Information sheets of the Confessing Church were printed in the cellar of Heinemann's house at Schinkelstrasse 34 in Essen, Moltkeviertel, and distributed all over Germany.

From 1936 to 1950, Heinemann was head of the YMCA in Essen.

In August 1945, he was elected as a member of the Council of the Protestant Church in Germany. The Council issued the Stuttgart Declaration of Guilt in October 1945 in which it confessed guilt for the failure of the Protestant church to oppose the Nazis and the Third Reich. Heinemann regarded the declaration as a "linchpin" in his work for the church.

From 1949 to 1955, Heinemann was president of the all-German Synod of the Protestant Churches of Germany. He was among the founders of the German Protestant Church Congress (Deutscher Evangelischer Kirchentag), a congress of the Protestant laity. In 1949, he was also one of the founding editors of Die Stimme der Gemeinde ("The Voice of the Congregation"), a magazine which was published by the Bruderrat (Brethren's Council) of the Confessing Church. In the World Council of Churches he belonged to its "Commission for International Affairs".

== Early political career ==
As a student, Heinemann, like his friends Lemmer and Roepke, belonged to the Reichsbund deutscher demokratischer Studenten, the student organisation of the liberal German Democratic Party, which strongly supported the democracy of the Weimar Republic.

Heinemann heard Hitler speak in Munich in 1920 and had to leave the room after interrupting Hitler's diatribe against the Jews. In 1930, Heinemann joined the Christlich-Sozialer Volksdienst ("Christian Social People's Service"), but he voted for the Social Democratic Party in 1933 to try to prevent a victory of the NSDAP.

== Postwar ==
After the World War II, the British authorities appointed Heinemann mayor of Essen, and in 1946, he was elected to that office, which he kept until 1949. He was one of the founders of the Christian Democratic Union in North Rhine-Westphalia, in which he saw an interdenominational and democratic association of people opposed to Nazism. He was a member of the North Rhine-Westphalian parliament (Landtag, 1947–1950), and from 1947 to 1948, he was Minister of Justice in the North Rhine-Westphalian government of CDU Prime Minister Karl Arnold.

When Konrad Adenauer became the first Chancellor of the newly founded Federal Republic of Germany in 1949, he wanted a representative of the Protestants in the CDU in his government. Heinemann, the president of the Synod of Protestant Churches, reluctantly agreed to become the Minister of the Interior, although he had planned to resume his career in industry.

A year later, when it became known that Adenauer had secretly offered German participation in a Western European army, Heinemann resigned from the government. He was convinced that any form of armament in West Germany would diminish the chances of German reunification and increase the risk of war.

Heinemann left the CDU, and in 1952 he founded his own political party, the All-German People's Party (Gesamtdeutsche Volkspartei). Among its members were such politicians as future Federal President Johannes Rau and also Erhard Eppler. They advocated negotiations with the Soviet Union with the aim of a reunited, neutral Germany between the blocs, but the GVP failed to attract many voters. Heinemann dissolved his party in 1957 and joined the Social Democratic Party of Germany (SPD), whose aims were relatively close to his own. There, he soon became a member of the party's National Executive. He helped the SPD to change into a Volkspartei (party of the people) by opening it up for socially-minded Protestants and middle-class people, especially in the industrial districts of Germany.

In October 1950, Heinemann had started practising as a lawyer again. In court, he predominantly represented political and religious minorities. He also worked for the release of prisoners in East Germany. Later, he defended conscientious objectors to compulsory military service and Jehovah's Witnesses in court. The latter refused to do even community work instead of military service because of their absolute conscientious objection.

As an MP in the Bundestag, the parliament of West Germany, Heinemann passionately fought against Adenauer's plans of acquiring atomic weapons for the West German army (Bundeswehr).

In the "Grand Coalition" government of Chancellor Kurt Georg Kiesinger (CDU) and Foreign Minister Willy Brandt (SPD), Heinemann was Minister of Justice (1966–1969). He initiated a number of liberal reforms, especially in the field of criminal law.

== President of West Germany ==
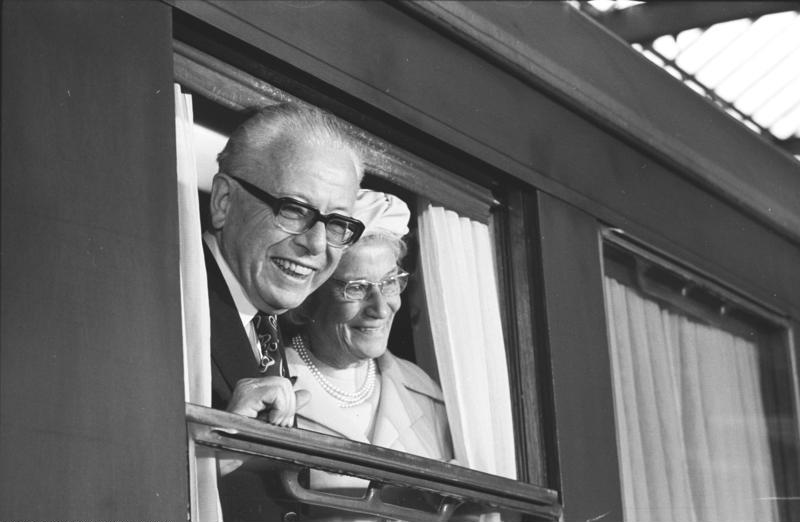
Farewell at Cologne station, 1974

In March 1969, Gustav Heinemann was elected President of West Germany. As he was elected with the help of most delegates of the Free Democratic Party (FDP/Liberals), his election was generally understood as a sign of the re-orientation of the FDP with regard to a future coalition with the SPD (Social-liberal coalition, October 1969 – October 1982).

In an interview, Heinemann once said that he wanted to be "the citizens' president" rather than "the president of the state". He established the tradition of inviting ordinary citizens to the president's New Year's receptions, and in his speeches, he encouraged West Germans to overcome the tradition of submissiveness to the authorities, to make full use of their democratic rights and to defend the rule of law and social justice. This attitude and his open-mindedness towards the student protests of 1968 made him popular among the younger generation as well. When asked whether he loved the West German state, he answered that he loved not the state but his wife.

Heinemann mainly visited countries that had been occupied by German troops in World War II. He supported the social-liberal government's policy of reconciliation with the Eastern European states. He promoted research into the nature of conflicts and of peace, as well as into environmental problems.

It was Heinemann's idea to found a museum for the commemoration of German liberation movements, and he was able to open such a place officially in Rastatt in 1974. His interest in that subject was partly from the involvement of his own ancestors in the revolution of 1848.

On account of his age and fragile health, Heinemann did not stand for a possible second term as President in 1974. He died in 1976. A short time before his death, Heinemann published an essay in which he criticised the Radikalenerlass ("Radicals Decree") of 1972, a rule that subjected all candidates for the civil service (including prospective teachers, railway engine drivers, and postmen) to special scrutiny to exclude political radicals. He thought it was not compatible with the spirit of the Constitution that a large group of people were generally treated as suspects.

The Gustav-Heinemann-Friedenspreis (Gustav Heinemann Peace Prize) is an annual prize for children's and young people's books that are deemed to have best promoted the cause of world peace.

== Honours and awards ==
- Grand Cross special class of the Order of Merit of the Federal Republic of Germany (1969)
- Knight Grand Cross with Collar of the Order of Merit of the Italian Republic (21 March 1973)
- Honorary Knight Grand Cross of the Order of the Bath (United Kingdom)
- Grand Star of the Decoration of Honour for Services to the Republic of Austria (1973)
- Knight of the Order of the Seraphim (Sweden, 25 May 1970)
- Knight of the Order of the Elephant (Denmark, 9 June 1970)

=== Named after Heinemann ===
- the Gustav-Heinemann-Bürgerpreis (donated in 1977 by the SPD)
- the Gustav-Heinemann-Friedenspreis für Kinder- und Jugendbücher (since 1982)
- the Gustav Heinemann Bildungsstätte educational and conference center in Bad Malente-Gremsmühlen
- Many schools
- A former military barracks in Essen (closed 2003)
- the Gustav-Heinemann-Brücke over the Spree in Berlin district Bezirk Mitte (since 2005)
- the Gustav-Heinemann-Gesamtschule in Alsdorf (comprehensive school, since 1976)

== Notes ==
Political offices
Preceded by Heinz Renner	Mayor of Essen; 1946–1949	Succeeded by Hans Toussaint
New title	Minister of the Interior; 1949–1950	Succeeded by Robert Lehr
Preceded by Richard Jaeger	Minister of Justice; 1966–1969	Succeeded by Horst Ehmke
Preceded by Heinrich Lübke	President of West Germany; 1969–1974	Succeeded by Walter Scheel
