= History of Germany =

The concept of Germany as a distinct region can be traced to Julius Caesar, who referred to the area east of the Rhine as Germania, meaning the land where the Germani live. Germanic tribes prevented annexation by the Roman Empire, although the Roman provinces of Germania Superior and Germania Inferior were established along the Rhine. Following the Fall of the Western Roman Empire, the Franks conquered the other West Germanic peoples. When the Frankish Empire was divided in 843, the eastern part became East Francia, and later Kingdom of Germany. In 962, Otto I became the first emperor of the Holy Roman Empire.

During the High Middle Ages, the Hanseatic League, dominated by German ports, established itself along the Baltic and North Seas. The State of the Teutonic Order was created in what would become Prussia. In the Late Middle Ages, dukes, princes, and bishops gained power at the expense of the emperors. Martin Luther led the Reformation against the Catholic Church after 1517, as northern and eastern states became Protestant, while others remained Catholic. The Thirty Years' War between 1618-48 brought destruction to the Holy Roman Empire, and the Imperial Estates attained autonomy in the Peace of Westphalia, including Austria, Prussia, Bavaria and Saxony. With the Napoleonic Wars, feudalism fell and the Holy Roman Empire dissolved in 1806. Napoleon established the Confederation of the Rhine as a puppet state, and after France's defeat, the German Confederation was established. The German revolutions of 1848–1849 failed but the Industrial Revolution modernized the economy, leading to urban growth and the socialist movement. Prussia, with its capital Berlin, grew in power. German universities became world-class centers for science, while music and art flourished. The first unification of Germany was achieved under Otto von Bismarck with the formation of the German Empire in 1871. Germany joined other powers in colonial expansion.

By 1900, Germany was the dominant power on the European continent, its industry surpassed Britain's while provoking it in a naval arms race. Germany led the Central Powers in World War I, was defeated, forced to pay war reparations, and stripped of territory. The German revolution of 1918–1919 ended the empire and established the democratic Weimar Republic. In 1933, Adolf Hitler, leader of the Nazi Party, used the hardship of the Great Depression, and resentment over the terms imposed after World War I, to establish a totalitarian regime. This Nazi Germany made antisemitism central to its policies, annexed German-speaking neighbors and invaded Poland, triggering World War II. The Nazis committed a genocide, the Holocaust, which killed 11 million people, including 6 million Jews. Germany was defeated in 1945, and occupied by the Allies. German territories were split up and annexed by Poland and the Soviet Union.

Germany spent the Cold War divided into the NATO-aligned West Germany and Warsaw Pact-aligned East Germany. Germans fled from Communist areas into West Germany, which experienced economic expansion, and became the dominant economy in Europe. In 1989, the Berlin Wall was opened, and East and West Germany were reunited. Franco-German friendship became the basis for the political integration of Europe in the European Union. In 1999 Germany was a founding member of the eurozone. In the 21st century, Angela Merkel served as its first female chancellor between 2005-21. The country steered the response to the euro area crisis, transitioned to sustainable energy, and took in a million people during the 2015 European migrant crisis — which fuelled the rise of the far-right Alternative for Germany.

== Prehistory ==
=== Paleolithic and Neolithic ages ===
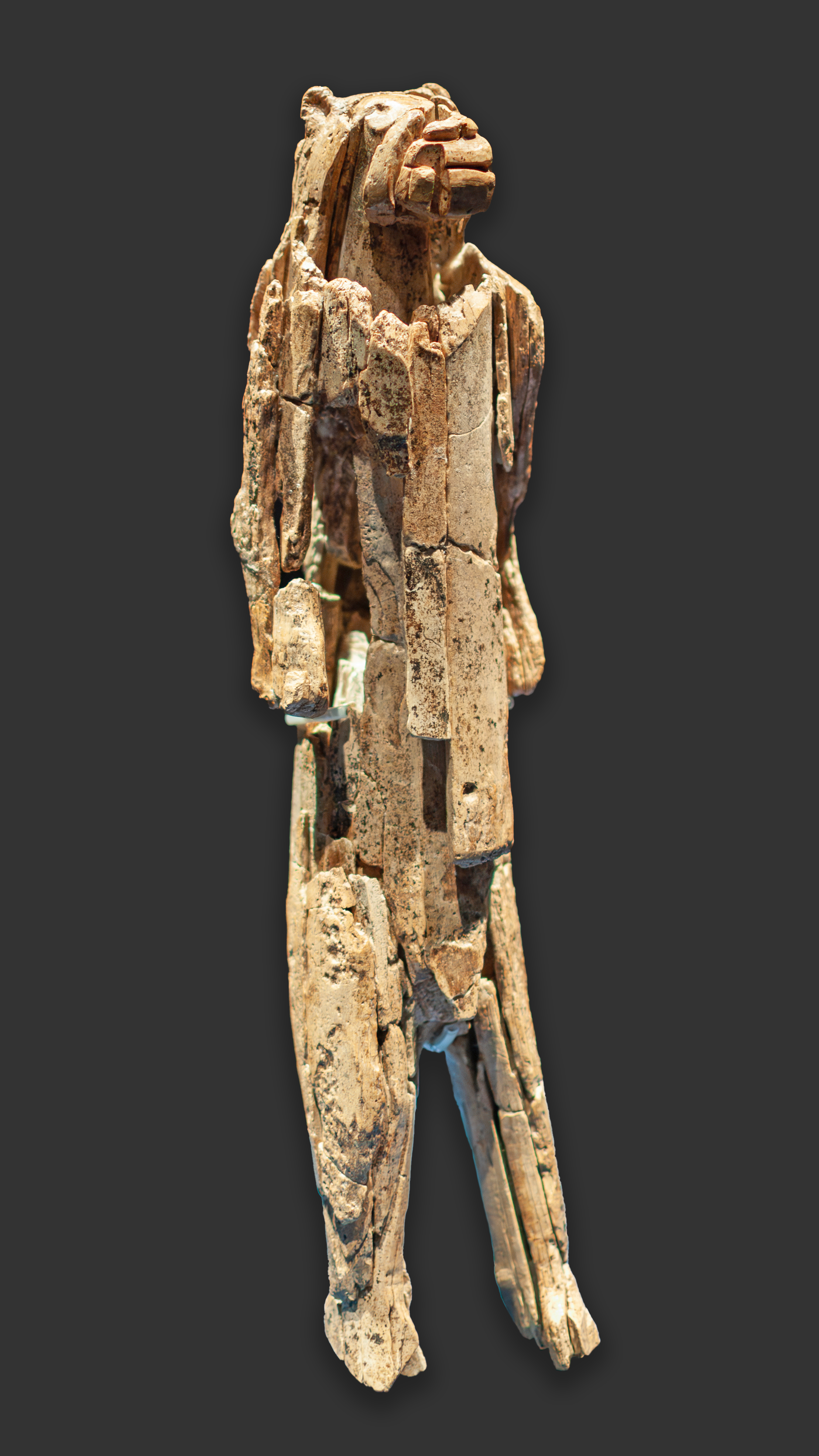
The Lion-man of Hohlenstein-Stadel, c. 40,000 BC

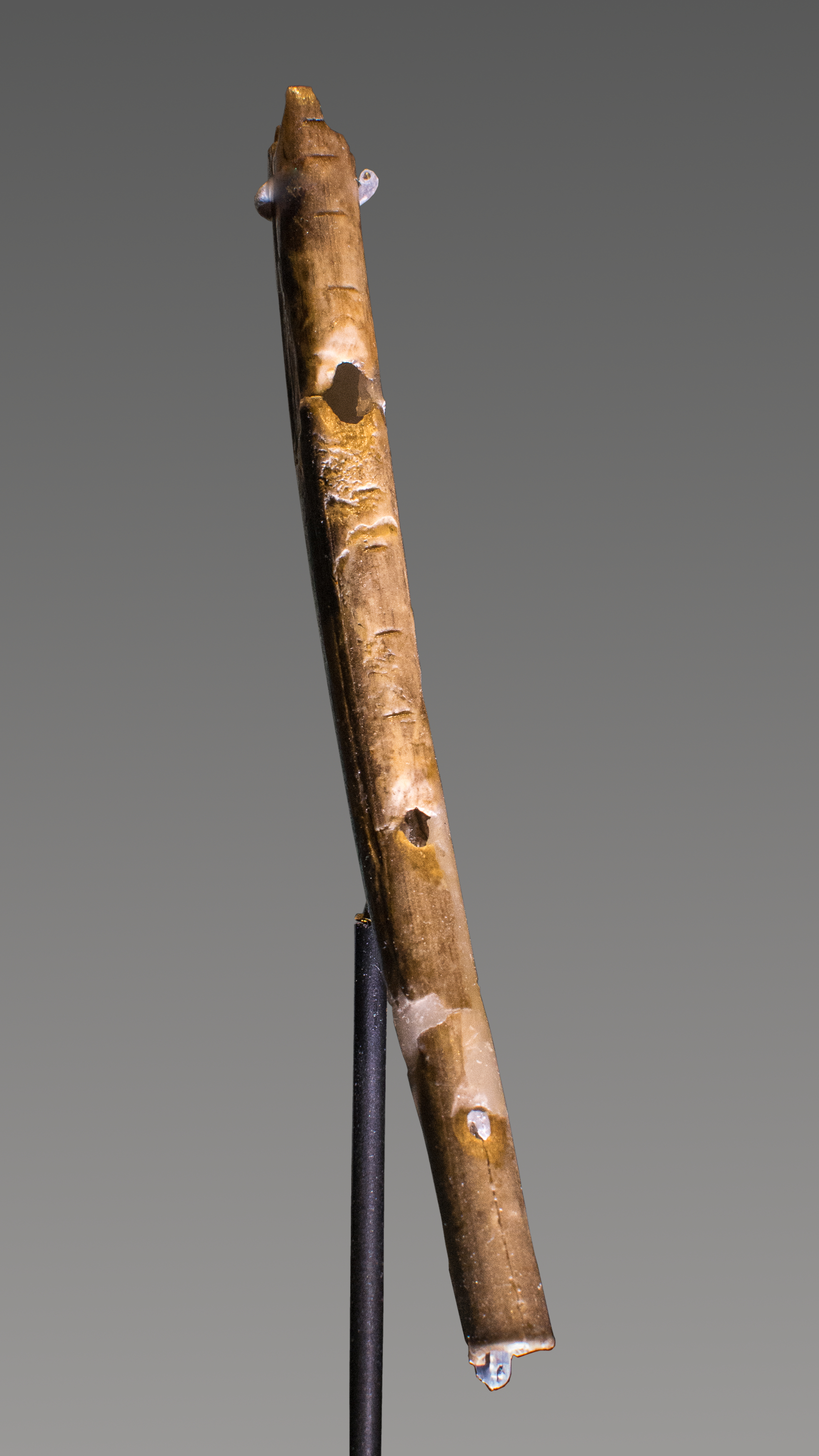
Bone flute from Geissenklösterle, 43,000–35,000 BC

The discovery of the Homo heidelbergensis mandible in 1907 affirms archaic human presence in Germany 600,000 years ago. The first non-modern human fossil, the Neanderthal, was discovered in the Neander Valley in 1856. The oldest complete set of hunting weapons ever found was excavated from a mine in Schöningen: ten 200,000-year-old wooden spears. The oldest traces of modern humans in Germany were found in the Ilsenhöhle cave, where 45,000-year-old remains were discovered. The remains of Paleolithic early modern human occupation uncovered in caves in the Swabian Jura, include sculptures. The 40,000-year-old Löwenmensch figurine and Venus of Hohle Fels represent the oldest uncontested human figurative art found.

Between 13,000 and 11,700 years ago, north-central Germany was part of the Ahrensburg culture. The first farmers, different from the indigenous hunter-gatherers, to migrate into Europe came from Anatolia, in the Neolithic period 10,000-8,000 years ago. Central Germany was a primary area of the Linear Pottery culture (c. 5500 BC – c. 4500 BC), contemporary with the Ertebølle culture (c. 5300 BC – c. 3950 BC) of north Germany. Construction of Neolithic circular enclosures in Central Europe occurred in this period. The oldest traces for use of the wheel and wagon are located at a Funnelbeaker culture site dated to 3400 BC.

=== Bronze Age ===
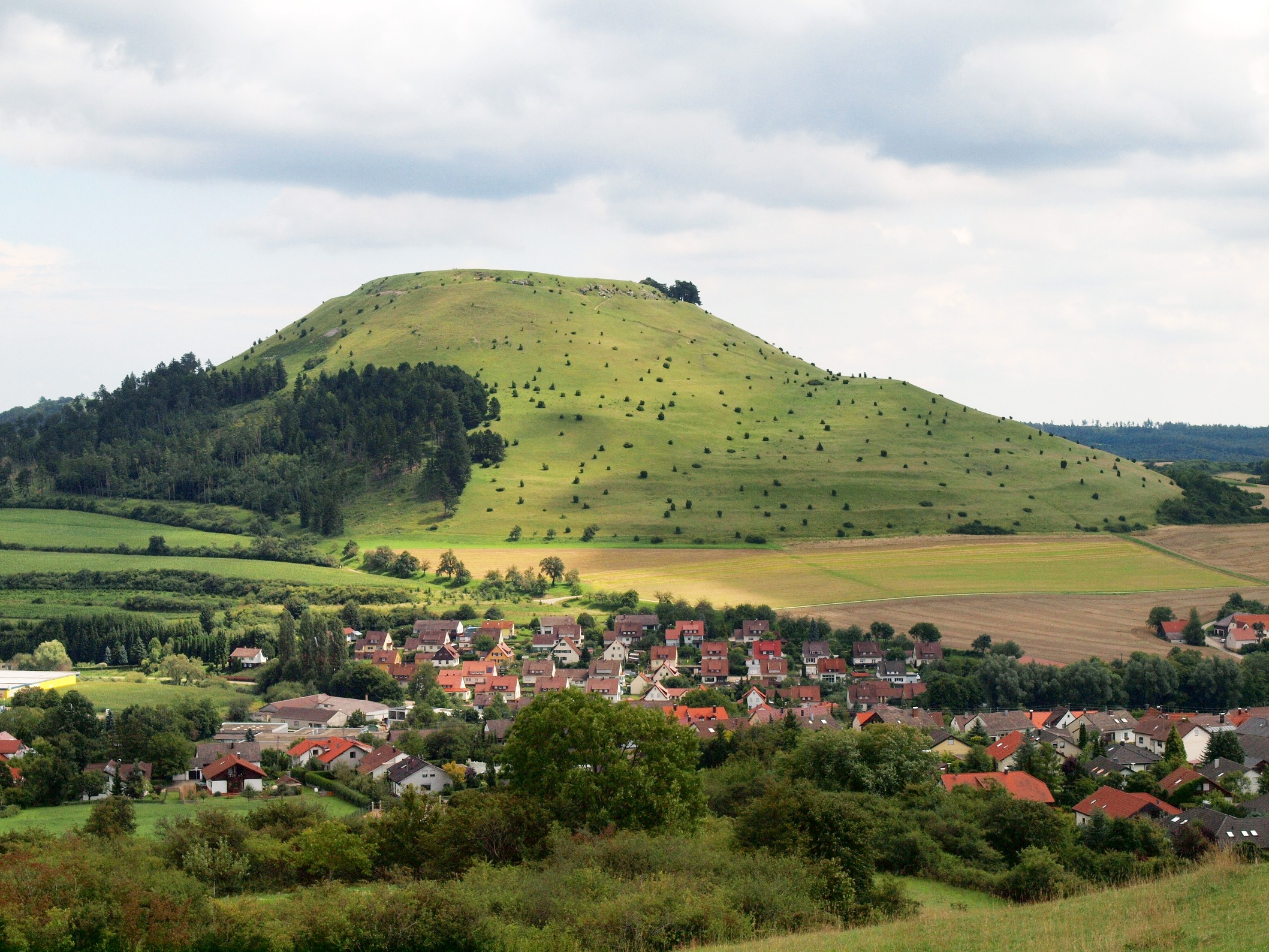
Ipf hillfort; the summit was levelled and fortified in the Urnfield period.

The settlers of the Corded Ware culture (c. 2900 BC – c. 2350 BC), that spread over the fertile plains of Central Europe during the Late Neolithic were of Indo-European ancestry. By the late Bronze Age, the Urnfield culture (c. 1300 BC – c. 750 BC) had replaced the Bell Beaker, Unetice and Tumulus cultures, whilst the Nordic Bronze Age had developed in Scandinavia and northern Germany. The Urnfield culture was succeeded by the Hallstatt culture.

=== Iron Age ===
The Hallstatt culture was the predominant Western and Central European culture from the 12th to 8th centuries BC and during the early Iron Age (8th to 6th centuries BC). It was followed by the La Tène culture (5th to 1st centuries BC). The people who adopted these cultural characteristics in central and southern Germany are regarded as Celts. Celtic cultural centres developed during the late Bronze Age (c. 1200 BC until 700 BC). Some, like the Heuneburg, the oldest city north of the Alps, became important cultural centres, that maintained trade routes to the Mediterranean. Beginning around 700 BC, Germanic peoples from southern Scandinavia and northern Germany expanded south and replaced the Celts.

== Germanic tribes, Roman conquests, and the Migration Period ==
=== Early migrations, the Suebi and the Roman Republic ===
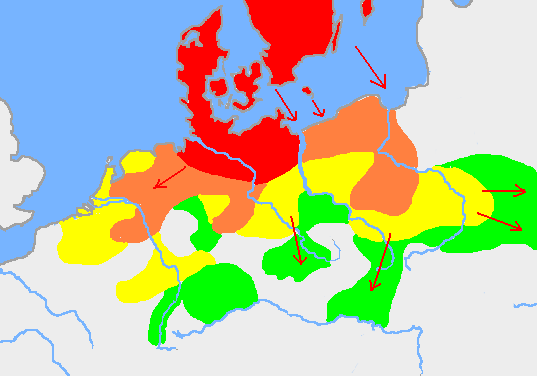
Expansion of early Germanic tribes into previously mostly Celtic Central Europe: Settlements before 750 BC New settlements by 500 BC New settlements by 250 BC New settlements by AD 1 Some sources also give a date of 750 BC for the earliest expansion out of southern Scandinavia and northern Germany along the North Sea coast towards the mouth of the Rhine.

The ethnogenesis of the Germanic peoples remains debated. For Averil Cameron "a steady process" occurred during the Nordic Bronze Age or Pre-Roman Iron Age. From Scandinavia and northern Germany the tribes expanded south, east and west during the 1st century BC, and encountered the Celts of Gaul, as well as Iranic, Baltic, and Slavic cultures in Central/Eastern Europe.

Evidence about the Germanic tribes comes from their encounters with the Romans, linguistic conclusions, as well as archaeological and archaeogenetic discoveries. In the 1st century BC, Roman statesman Julius Caesar erected the first known bridges across the Rhine and led a military contingent into the tribes' territories. Caesar had no contact with them as they retreated inland. By 60 BC, the Suebi tribe had conquered lands of the Gallic Aedui tribe to the west of the Rhine. Plans to populate the region with Germanic settlers from the east were opposed by Caesar, who had launched his campaign to subjugate Gaul. Caesar defeated the Suebi forces in 58 BC in the Battle of Vosges and forced them to retreat.

=== Roman settlement of the Rhine ===
The Porta Nigra in Trier, capital of the Roman province of Gallia Belgica, constructed in 170 AD

Augustus considered conquest beyond the Rhine and Danube not only regular foreign policy, but necessary to counter Germanic incursions into a rebellious Gaul. Forts and commercial centres were established along the rivers. Some tribes, such as the Ubii, allied with Rome and adopted Roman culture.

During the 1st century CE Roman legions conducted campaigns into Germania, north of the Upper Danube and east of the Rhine, attempting to subdue the tribes. Roman ideas of administration, taxes and a legal framework were frustrated by the absence of infrastructure. A coalition of tribes under Arminius, who was familiar with Roman tactics, defeated a large Roman force at the Battle of the Teutoburg Forest. Consequently, Rome resolved to permanently establish the border and refrain from advance into Germania. By AD 100 the frontier along the Rhine, Danube and Limes Germanicus was established. Several Germanic tribes lived under Roman rule south and west of the border. The provinces Germania Inferior and Germania Superior were established in 85 AD, after long campaigns as lasting military control was confined to the lands surrounding the rivers. Christianity was introduced to Roman-controlled west Germania before the Middle Ages, with Christian religious structures such as the Aula Palatina built during the reign of Constantine the Great (r. 306–337).

=== Migration Period and decline of the Western Roman Empire ===
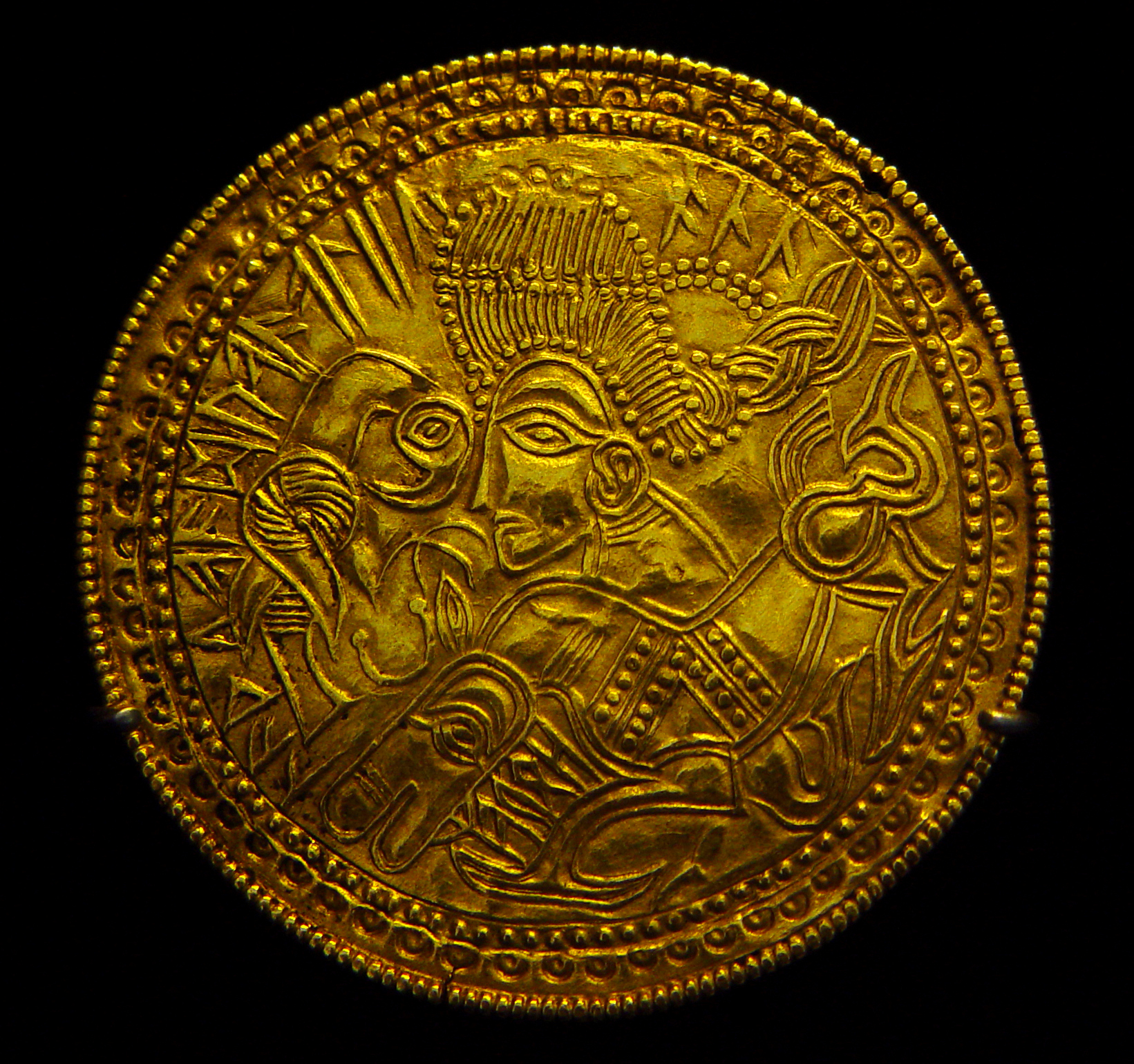
A Migration Period gold bracteate depicting bird, horse, and stylized human head with a Suebian knot

Rome's Third Century Crisis coincided with the emergence of large West Germanic tribes: the Alemanni, Franks, Baiuvarii, Chatti, Saxons, Frisii, Sicambri, and Thuringi. By the 3rd century the Germanic speaking peoples began to migrate beyond the limes and the Danube frontier. Large tribes such as the Visigoths, Ostrogoths, Vandals, Burgundians, Lombards, Saxons and Franks, migrated and played their part in the fall of the Roman Empire and transformation of the old Western Roman Empire.

By the end of the 4th century the Huns invaded eastern and central Europe, establishing the Hunnic Empire. The event triggered the Migration Period. Hunnic hegemony over a vast territory in central and eastern Europe lasted until the death of Attila's son Dengizich in 469. Another pivotal moment was the Crossing of the Rhine in 406 by tribes including Vandals, Alans and Suebi who settled within the declining Western Roman Empire.

=== Stem duchies and marches ===
Stem duchies refer to the traditional territories of the Germanic tribes. The concept of such duchies survived, especially in areas which by the 9th century constituted East Francia, which included the Duchy of Bavaria, Duchy of Swabia, Duchy of Saxony.

The Salian emperors (1027–1125) retained the stem duchies. They became less relevant during the medieval period under the Hohenstaufen. Frederick Barbarossa abolished them in 1180 in favour of more numerous territorial duchies. Successive kings founded border counties or marches in the east and north.

== Middle Ages ==
=== Frankish Empire ===
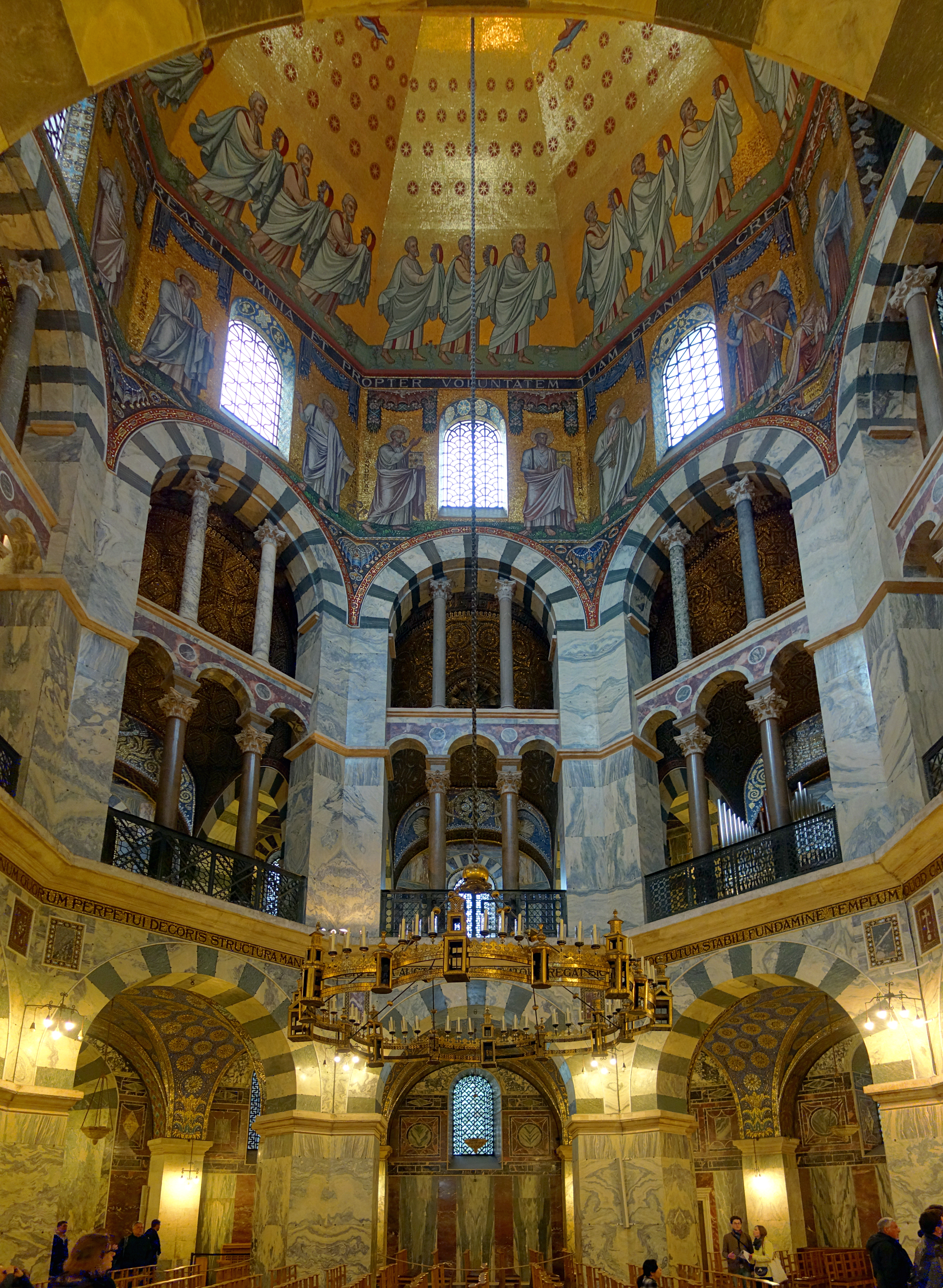
The Palatine Chapel, Aachen, built during the reign of the Carolingian emperor Charlemagne (r. 800–814 AD)

The Western Roman Empire fell in 476 with the deposition of Romulus Augustus by Germanic leader Odoacer. The Franks emerged as a tribal confederacy in the territory called Austrasia, the northeast portion of the future Kingdom of the Merovingian Franks. Austrasia comprised parts of present-day France, Germany, Belgium and the Netherlands. The Franks absorbed former Roman territory as they spread into Gaul, beginning in 250. Clovis I of the Merovingian dynasty conquered northern Gaul in 486 and, in the Battle of Tolbiac in 496, the Alemanni tribe in Swabia, which became the Duchy of Swabia.

By 500, Clovis had united the Frankish tribes, and was proclaimed King of the Franks around 510. Clovis, unlike most Germanic rulers, was baptized Catholic instead of Arian. After Clovis' death in 511, his four sons partitioned his kingdom. During the 5th and 6th centuries the Merovingian kings expanded Frankish control over much of what is now Germany, subjugating the Thuringi and Burgundians. The Merovingians placed Francia regions under dukes, and followed imperial Roman methods to integrate conquered territories. While allowed to preserve their legal systems, the tribes were pressured to abandon Arianism.

In 718 Charles Martel waged war against the Saxons in support of the Neustrians. By 750, the Catholic Franks controlled a vast territory in Gaul, Germany, Swabia, Burgundy and Switzerland: Francia. Under pressure from Liutprand, King of the Lombards, the papacy sought help from Martel, after his victory over the Umayyad Caliphate at the Battle of Tours in 732. However, a lasting alliance only materialized after Charles' death, under his successor Pepin the Short. In 751 Pepin assumed the title of king and was anointed by the Church. Pope Stephen II bestowed him the hereditary title of Patricius Romanorum as protector of Rome and St. Peter in response to the Donation of Pepin which guaranteed the Papal States sovereignty.

=== Foundation of the Holy Roman Empire ===
After Pepin's death in 768, his son Charlemagne consolidated his power and expanded Francia. Charlemagne ended 200 years of Lombard rule with the Siege of Pavia (773–774), and installed himself as King of the Lombards. Loyal Frankish nobles replaced the Lombard aristocracy following a rebellion in 776. The next 30 years saw the conquest of the Slavs and Pannonian Avars in the east, and all tribes, such as the Saxons and Bavarians. The Saxon Wars lasted from 772 to 804. The Franks overwhelmed their rivals, converted them to Christianity, and annexed their lands to the Carolingian Empire. On Christmas Day, 800 AD, Charlemagne was crowned Imperator Romanorum (Emperor of the Romans) in Rome by Pope Leo III.

Fighting among Charlemagne's three grandsons over continuation of partible inheritance, or the introduction of primogeniture, caused the Carolingian empire to be partitioned into three parts by the Treaty of Verdun of 843. Louis the German received East Francia, all lands east of the Rhine river and north of Italy. This encompassed the German stem duchies that were united in a federation under the first non-Frankish king Henry the Fowler, who ruled from 919 to 936. The royal court moved between strongholds, Kaiserpfalzen, that developed into economic and cultural centres. Aachen Palace played a central role, as the local Palatine Chapel served as the site for coronations until 1531.

=== Ottonian dynasty ===
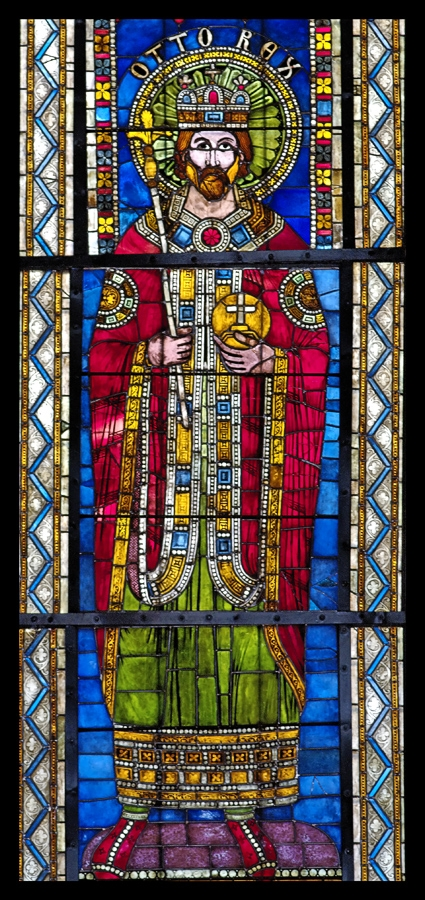
12th-century stained glass depiction of Otto I, Holy Roman Emperor

In 936 Otto I was crowned German king at Aachen, then in 961 King of Italy in Pavia, and emperor by Pope John XII in Rome in 962. The tradition of the German king as protector of the Kingdom of Italy and Latin Church resulted in the term Holy Roman Empire in the 12th century. Otto strengthened royal authority by re-asserting Carolingian rights over bishops and abbots appointments from the nobles; these appointments controlled large land holdings. Otto supported celibacy for the higher clergy, so ecclesiastical appointments never became hereditary. By granting lands with these appointments, Otto turned them into "princes of the Empire" (Reichsfürsten), and so established a national church. External threats were contained with the defeat of the Hungarian Magyars at the Battle of Lechfeld in 955, which ended the Hungarian invasions of German territory. The Slavs between the Elbe and Oder rivers, collectively known as Wends, were subjugated. Otto drove Pope John XII from the papal throne and then controlled the election of the pope, setting a precedent for imperial control of the papacy.

Otto I was followed by his son Otto II as emperor 973–83, Otto II's wife Theophanu regent 983–91, his own wife Adelaide of Italy as regent 991–5, and his grandson Otto III as emperor 996–1002. The Slavic revolt of 983 brought German expansion east of the Elbe to a prolonged halt. Otto III was succeeded by his second cousin Henry II, who died childless.

=== Salian dynasty ===
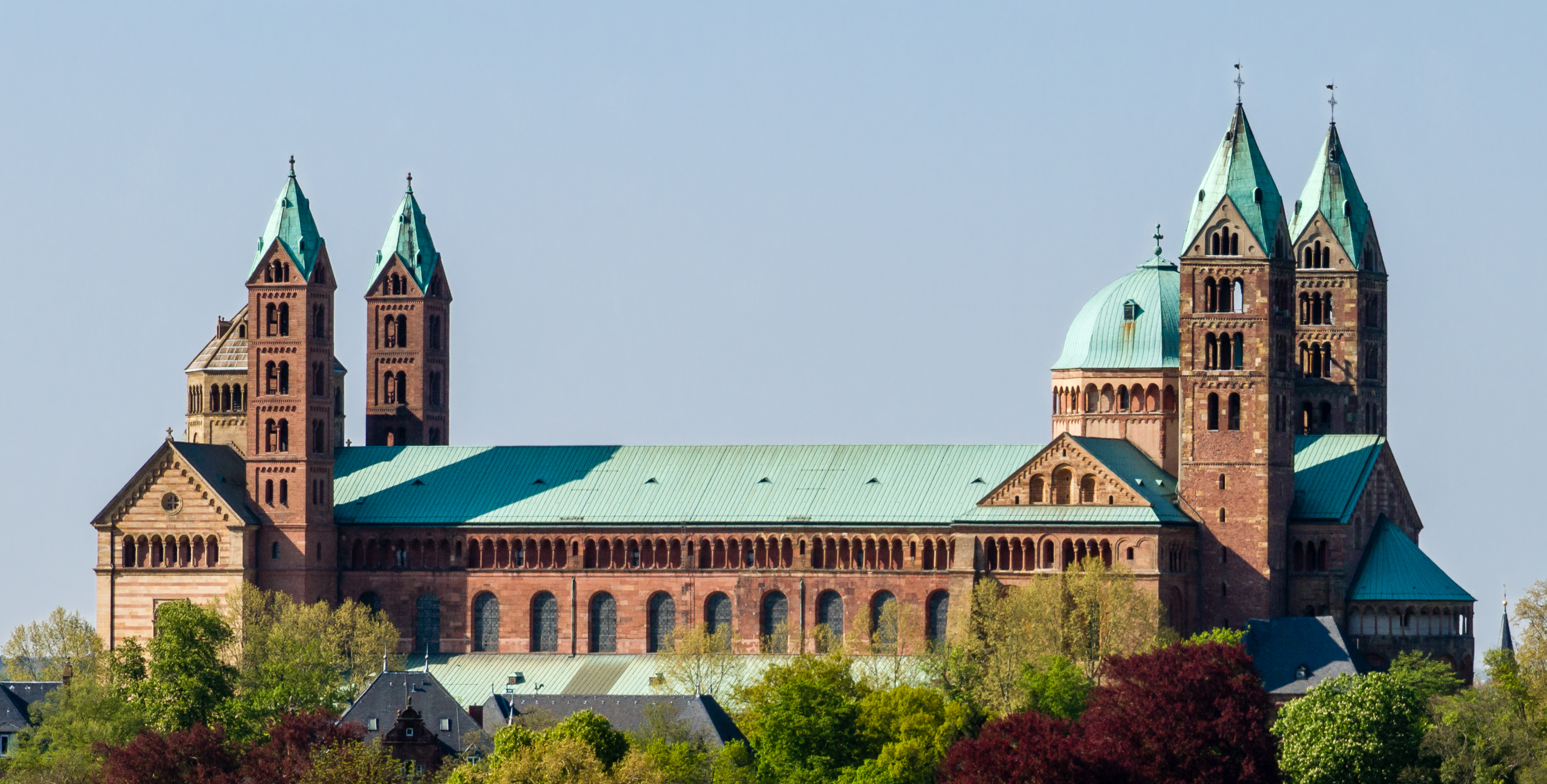
Speyer Cathedral, consecrated in 1061

Henry II was succeeded by Conrad II, the first emperor of the Salian dynasty. During the reign of Conrad's son, Henry III (1039–56), the empire supported the Cluniac Reforms of the Church, the Peace of God, prohibition of simony (purchase of clerical offices), and priest celibacy. Imperial authority over the Pope peaked. However, Rome reacted with the creation of the College of Cardinals and Pope Gregory VII's clerical reforms. Gregory insisted in his Dictatus Papae on papal authority over ecclesiastical appointments. The subsequent conflict in which emperor Henry IV was compelled to submit to the Pope at Canossa in 1077, after having been excommunicated, became known as the Investiture Controversy. The conflict contributed to the Saxon revolt of 1077–1088 against Henry IV. In 1122, a reconciliation was reached between Henry V and the Pope with the Concordat of Worms. This saw the papacy regain control over religious affairs. Consequently, the Ottonian church system (Reichskirche) declined, and ended the imperial tradition of appointing powerful clerical leaders to counter the secular princes.

The term sacrum imperium (Holy Empire), identified with Germany, was first used by Frederick Barbarossa in 1157, and Sacrum Romanum Imperium, Holy Roman Empire, were combined in 1180 and inconsistently appeared on documents from 1254. Nationis Germanicæ (of the German nation) was added to the title emperor after the last imperial coronation in 1452.

=== Hanseatic League ===
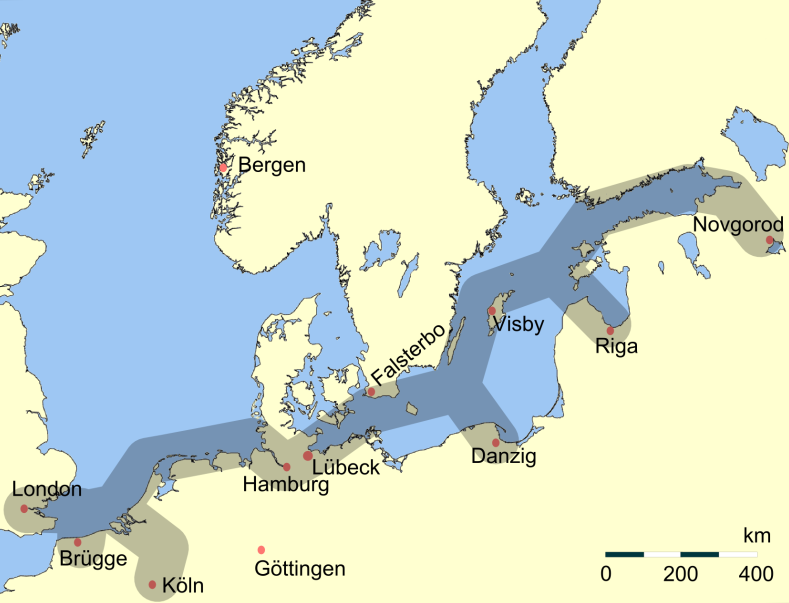
Main trading routes of the Hanseatic League

The Hanseatic League was a commercial and defensive alliance of the merchant guilds of towns and cities in north Europe that dominated trade in the Baltic Sea, North Sea and along the navigable rivers, during the Middle Ages. Each affiliated city retained the legal system of its sovereign and, with the exception of the Free imperial cities, had some political autonomy.

Beginning with an agreement between Lübeck and Hamburg, guilds cooperated to strengthen and combine economic assets, like securing trading routes and tax privileges, to control prices and better market their commodities. Important centres of commerce, such as Cologne and Bremen joined the union, which resulted in greater diplomatic esteem. Recognized by the regional princes for its economic potential, favourable charters for commercial operations were granted. During its zenith the alliance maintained trading posts in virtually all cities between London and Edinburgh in the west, to Novgorod in the east. By the 14th century the powerful league enforced its interests with military means if necessary. This culminated in a war with Denmark from 1361 to 1370. The league declined after 1450 due to factors such as the Crisis of the Late Middle Ages, the territorial lords' shifting policies towards greater commercial control, the silver crisis and marginalization in the Eurasian trade network.

=== Eastward expansion ===
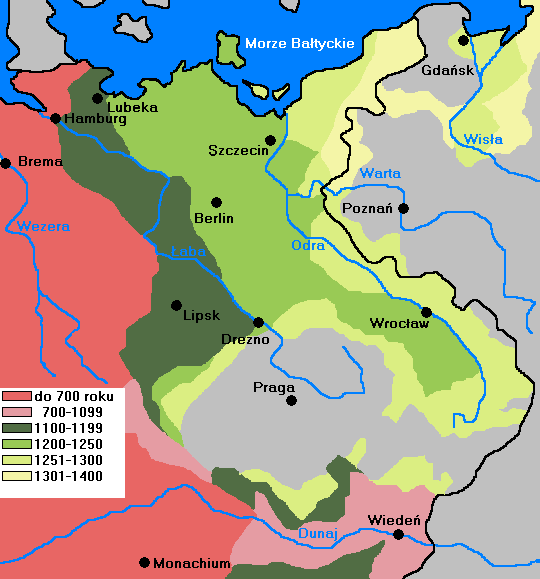
Stages of the German eastern expansion

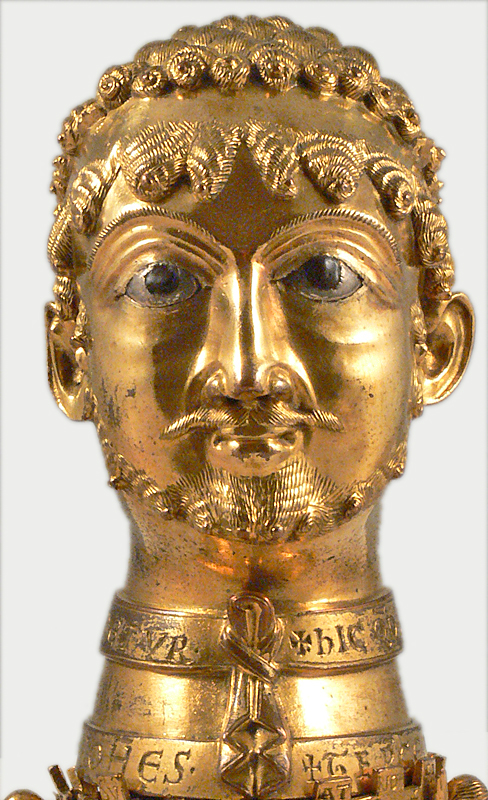
Golden bust of Frederick Barbarossa, given to his godfather Count Otto of Cappenberg in 1171

The Ostsiedlung (Eastern settlement) was a process of German migration and settlement in territories east of the Saale and Elbe rivers, including areas inhabited by Polabian Slavs and Balts, as well as Bohemia, during the 11th to 14th centuries. The imperial military campaigns into eastern lands during the 10th and 11th centuries, were to subjugate the heathen tribes. Conquered territories were incorporated into the empire as marches, fortified borderlands with troops in strongholds and castles, who ensured military control and enforced exaction of tributes.

In 1230, the monastic order of the Teutonic Knights launched the Prussian Crusade. The campaign, supported by the forces of Polish duke Konrad I of Masovia, intended to Christianize the Baltic Old Prussians, succeeded in conquest of vast territories. The order, emboldened by imperial approval, resolved to establish a state without the consent of Konrad. Recognizing only papal authority, the order expanded the Teutonic state over 150 years. Conflict with the Kingdom of Poland, the Grand Duchy of Lithuania, and the Novgorod Republic, eventually led to military defeat and containment by the mid-15th century. The last Grand Master of the Teutonic Order Albert of Brandenburg turned the remaining lands into the secular Duchy of Prussia.

=== Church and state ===
Henry V became Holy Roman Emperor in 1111. Hoping to control the church, he appointed Adalbert of Saarbrücken as archbishop of Mainz. Adalbert however turned against him and asserted the power of church. This precipitated the "Crisis of 1111" as part of the Investiture Controversy. In 1137, the prince-electors turned back to the Hohenstaufen family for a candidate, Conrad III. Conrad tried to divest rival Henry the Proud of Bavaria and Saxony, which led to war as the empire divided into two factions. The Guelphs supported the House of Welf of Henry the Proud. The rival Ghibellines pledged allegiance to the Swabian House of Hohenstaufen. The Guelphs wanted ecclesiastical independence under the papacy and a focus on ducal interests against imperial authority. The Ghibellines championed control of the church and strong imperial government.

Under Hohenstaufen emperor Frederick Barbarossa, an accommodation was reached in 1156 between the factions. Bavaria was returned to Henry the Proud's son Henry the Lion, who represented the Guelphs. The Margraviate of Austria was separated from Bavaria and turned into the Duchy of Austria in 1156. Having become wealthy through trade, the cities of north Italy opposed Barbarossa's claim of feudal rule. They united in the Lombard League and defeated Barbarossa at the Battle of Legnano in 1176. A reconciliation was reached between the emperor and Pope Alexander III in the Treaty of Venice. In 1180, Henry the Lion was outlawed, Saxony was divided, and Bavaria was given to Otto of Wittelsbach, who founded the Wittelsbach dynasty which ruled Bavaria until 1918.

From 1184 to 1186, the empire under Barbarossa reached its cultural peak with the Diet of Pentecost and the marriage of his son Henry to the Norman princess Constance of Sicily. Chivalry and court life flowered, as expressed in the scholastic philosophy of Albertus Magnus and literature of Wolfram von Eschenbach. The death of Henry VI in 1197, however, triggered the German throne dispute, a prolonged struggle between Philip of Swabia and Otto of Brunswick that lasted until 1215 and further weakened central imperial authority.

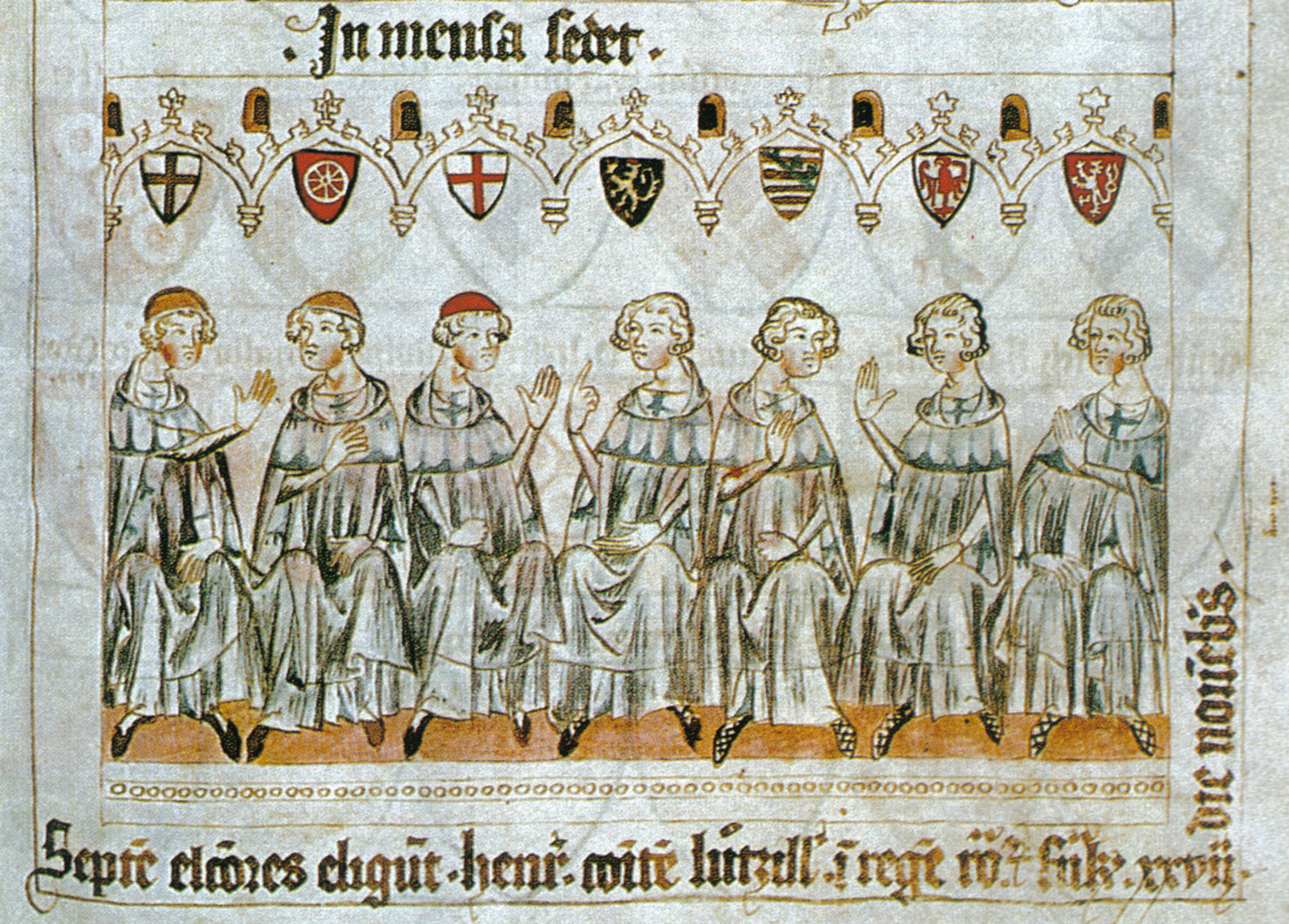
The imperial prince-electors, Codex Balduini Trevirorum, c. 1340

Between 1212-50, Frederick II established a professionally-administered state. He resumed the war in Italy. Sovereign powers were granted to ecclesiastical and secular princes, leading to the rise of independent states. The struggle with the Pope sapped the empire's strength, Frederick II was excommunicated three times. After his death, the Hohenstaufen dynasty fell, followed by an interregnum of no Emperor: 1250–73. This ended with the election of a Swabian count, Rudolf I of Germany.

The failure of negotiations between Emperor Louis IV and the papacy led to the 1338 Declaration at Rhense by princes of the Imperial Estate, that election by the majority of the electors automatically conferred the royal title and rule over the empire, without papal confirmation. As a result, the monarch became dependent on the favour of the electors. Between 1346-78 Emperor Charles IV sought to restore imperial authority. The Golden Bull of 1356 stipulated that emperors were to be chosen by a college of only seven electors.

Between 1347-51 Europe was consumed by the Black Death pandemic, which killed 30-60% of the population. It led to social disruption, religious disaffection and fanaticism. Jews in particular were blamed, singled out and attacked. Many Jews fled and resettled in Eastern Europe.

=== Towns and cities ===
Population estimates of the German territories range between 5-6 million in 1056 and 7-8 million in 1190. Most people were farmers, typically in serfdom under feudal lords and monasteries. Towns emerged and in the 12th century new cities were founded along trading routes and near imperial strongholds and castles. Towns were subjected to the municipal legal system. Cities such as Cologne, that had acquired the status of Imperial Free Cities, were no longer answerable to landlords or bishops, but subjects of the Emperor and enjoyed commercial and legal liberties. The towns were ruled by a council of the – usually mercantile – elite, the patricians. Craftsmen formed craft guilds, governed by strict rules, which sought to obtain control of the towns. Society had diversified, but was divided into classes of the clergy, physicians, merchants, guilds of artisans, unskilled labourers and peasants. Full citizenship was unavailable to paupers. Political tensions arose from taxation, public spending, regulation of business, and market supervision, as well as the limits of corporate autonomy.

=== Learning and culture ===
Around 1439 Johannes Gutenberg used movable type thereby starting the Printing Revolution. Cheap printed books and pamphlets spread the Reformation and Scientific Revolution.

Influential German-speaking printers, authors, artists and scholars of the Middle Ages and Renaissance
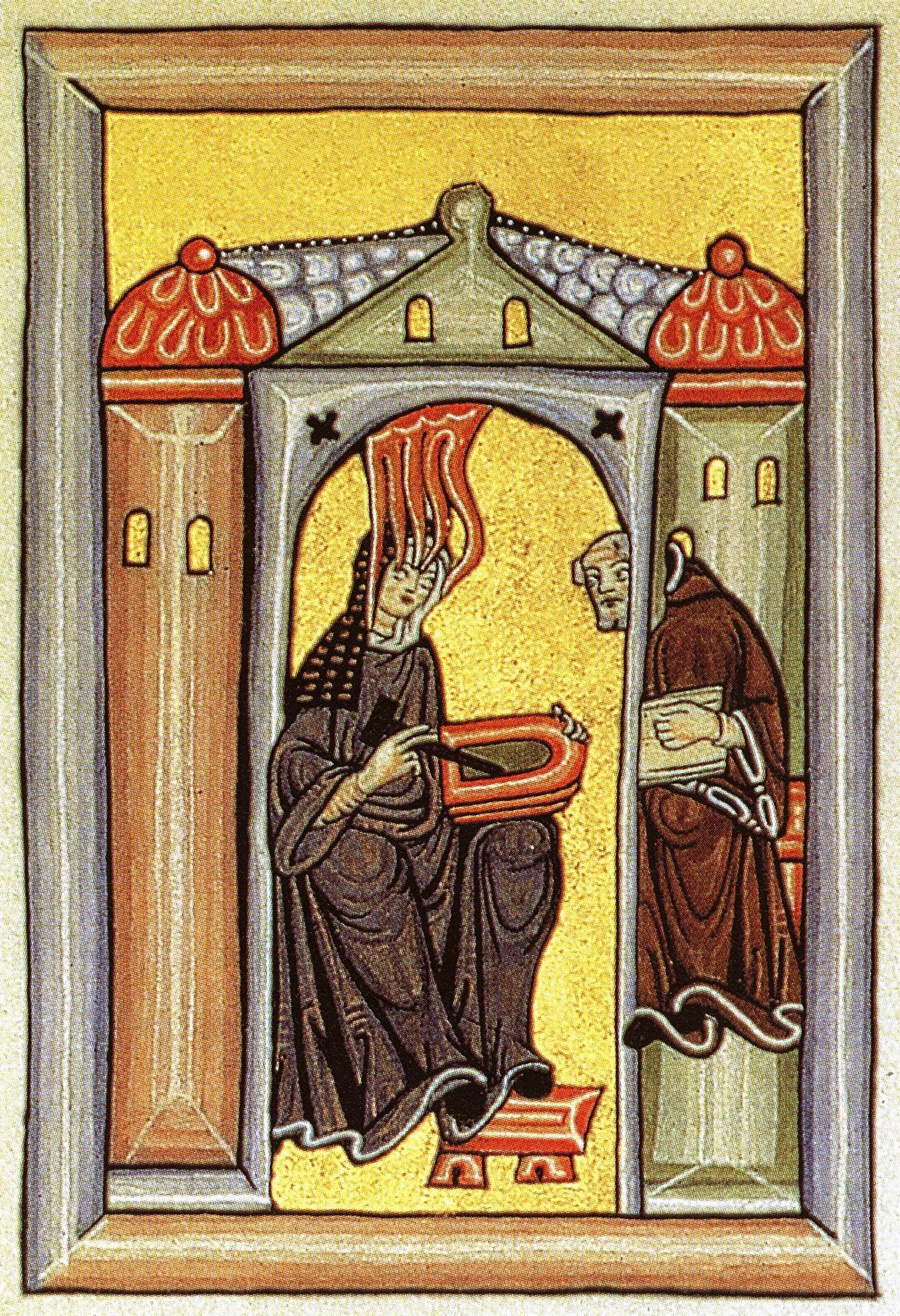
Abbess Hildegard of Bingen wrote influential theological, botanical, medicinal texts, and the morality play, Ordo Virtutum, while supervising illuminated manuscripts

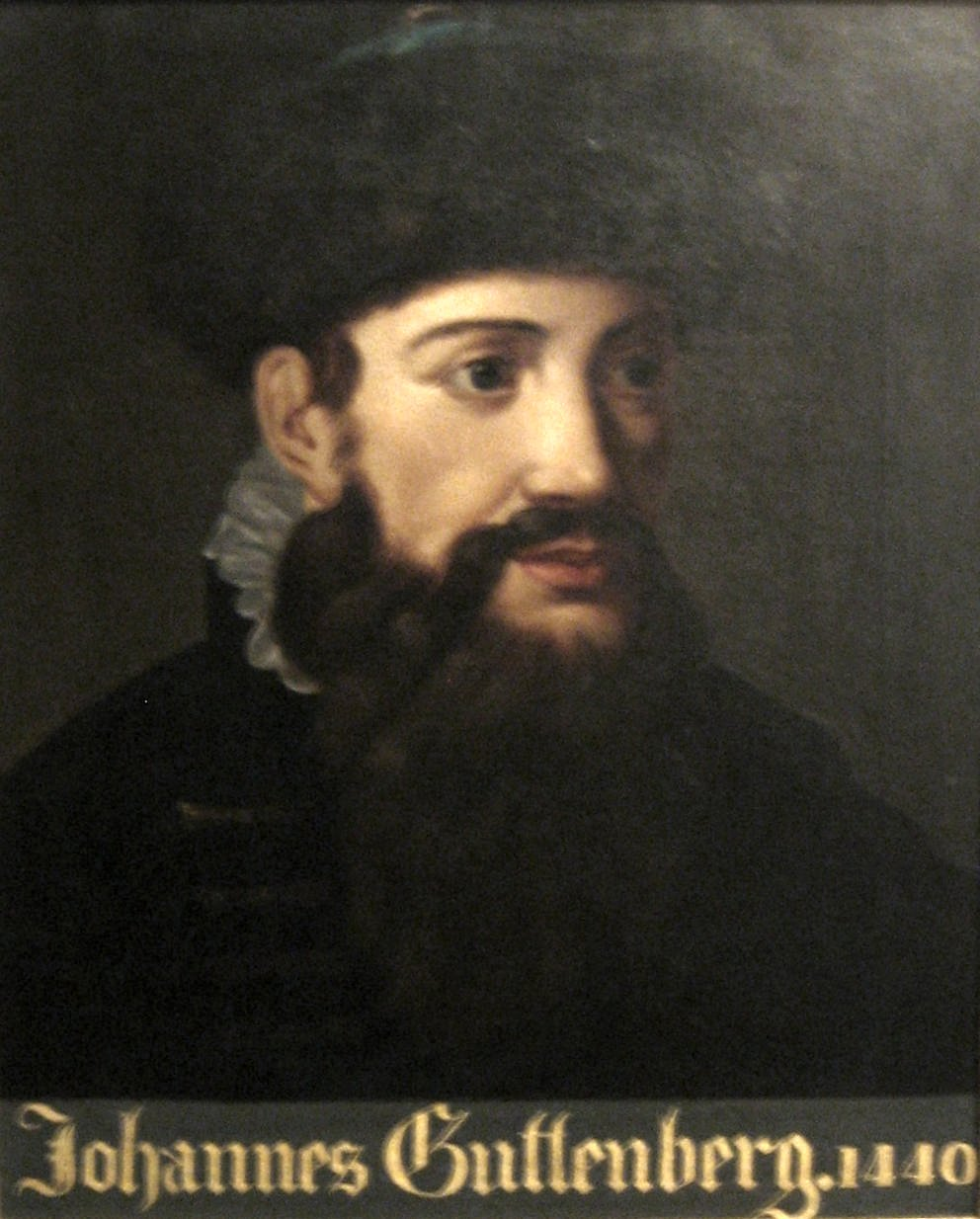
Around 1439, Johannes Gutenberg pioneering user of the printing press, used movable type printing, thereby starting the Printing Revolution. He issued the Gutenberg Bible in 1455.

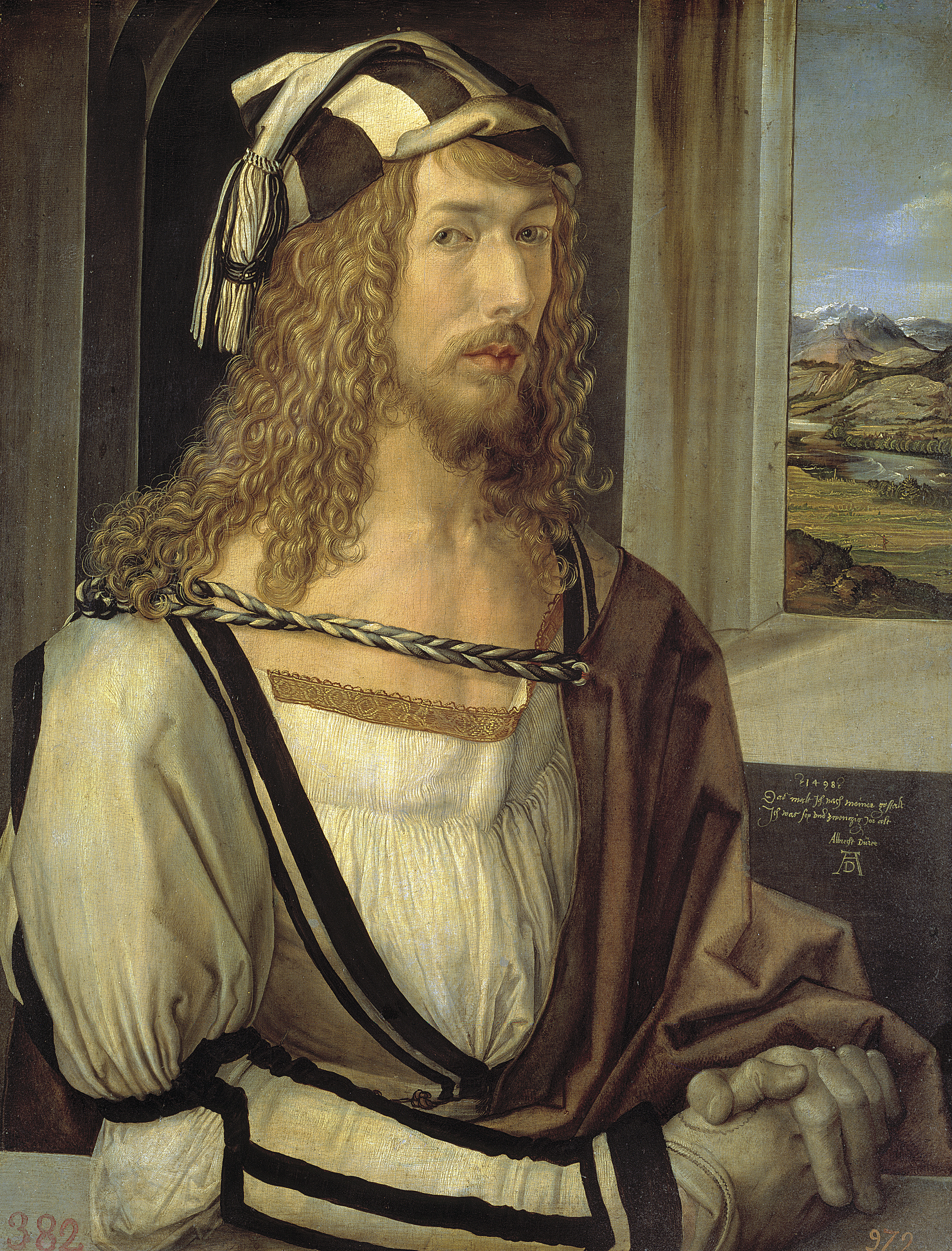
Around 1500 Albrecht Dürer established his reputation across Europe as painter, printmaker, mathematician, engraver, theorist, and important figure of the Northern Renaissance.

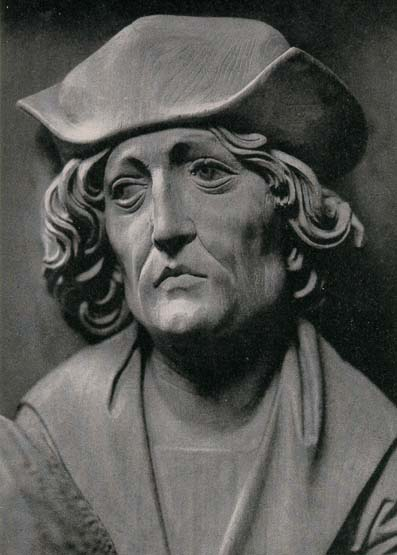
Tilman Riemenschneider, most accomplished sculptor, woodcarver and master in stone from the late Gothic to the Renaissance

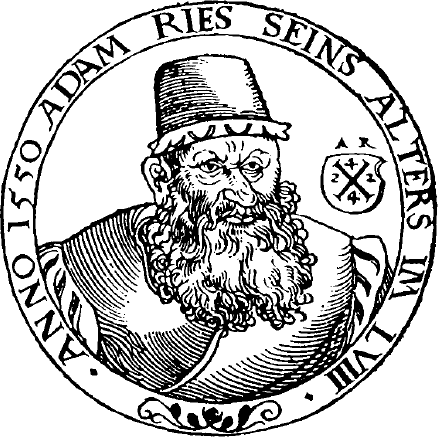
Adam Ries is known as the "father of modern calculating" because of his recognition that Roman numerals are unpractical and to their replacement by Arabic numerals.

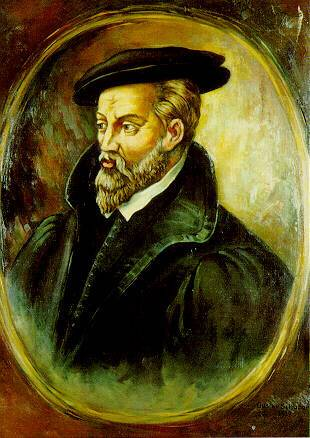
Georgius Agricola was the first to drop the Arabic definite article al-, exclusively writing chymia and chymista describing chemistry. He is referred to as the father of mineralogy and founder of geology as a scientific discipline.

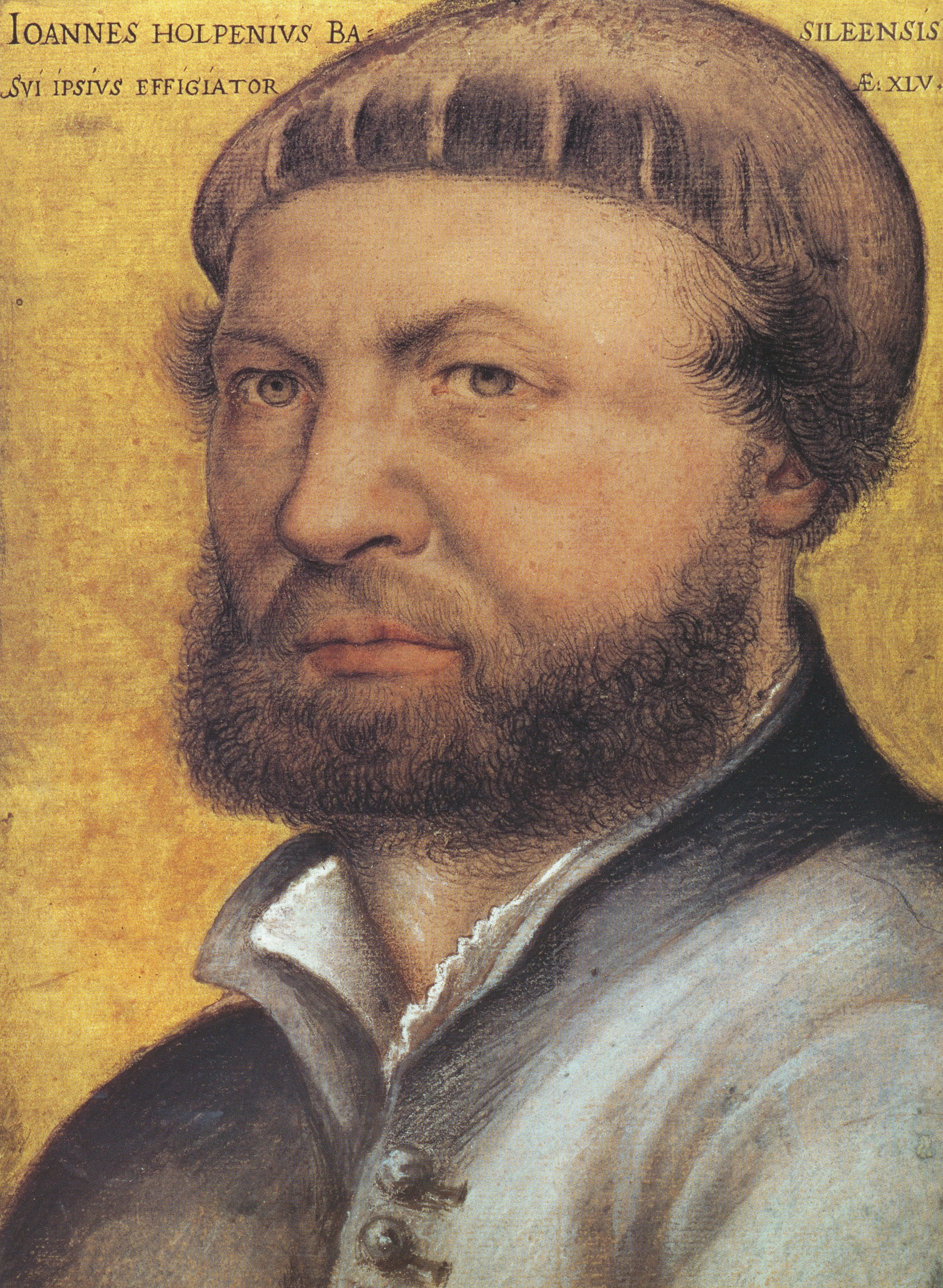
Hans Holbein the Younger is one of the great portraitists of the 16th century.

== Reformation and Renaissance ==
=== Social changes ===
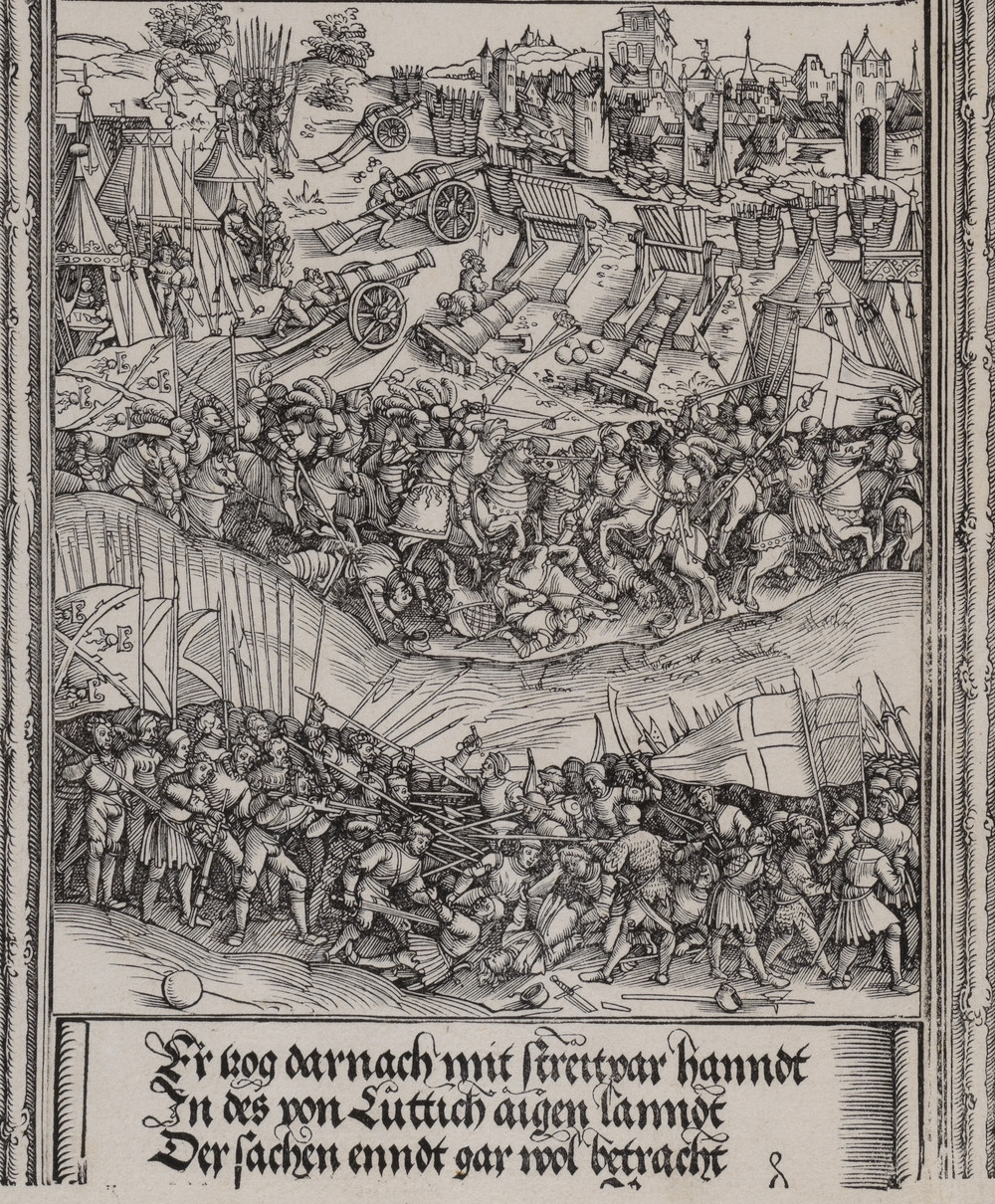
Part of Albrecht Dürer's Triumphal Arch, 1515. It shows a new coordinated professional military, with large-scale infantry, traditional cavalry, now supplemented with a new resource, portable artillery.

From 1438 the Habsburg dynasty, who had acquired control over the Duchy of Austria, Bohemia and Hungary, managed to permanently occupy the position of the Holy Roman Emperor until 1806.

European society developed after the disasters of the 14th century, as religious obedience and political loyalties declined in the wake of the plague, the Western Schism and dynastic wars. The rise of the free cities and emergence of the burgher class eroded the societal and economic order of feudalism. The commercial enterprises of the mercantile elites in the developing cities in South Germany generated unprecedented wealth. As financiers to ecclesiastical and secular rulers, rich families fundamentally influenced the empire during the fifteenth and sixteenth centuries. The increasingly money-based economy provoked discontent among knights and peasants, and predatory "robber knights" became common. Maximilian's military reforms caused a military revolution that broke the knight class.

Some Europe-wide revolutions were born in the empire: the combination of the first modern postal system established by Maximilian, with the printing system invented by Gutenberg, produced a communication revolution. The Empire's decentralized nature made censorship difficult and combined with the printing press to facilitate free expression. This helped authorities to disseminate orders and policies, boosted the Empire's coherence, and helped reformers like Luther to broadcast their views, thus driving Reformation.

=== Imperial reform ===
During his reign from 1493 to 1519, Maximilian I reformed the empire. Supreme courts were established; the Imperial Diet became the supreme political, legal and constitutional institution; the Reichskreise were created (Imperial Circles, which organised armies, collected taxes and enforced orders of the imperial institutions); the Landsknechte became a form of imperial army; a national political culture emerged; and the German language began to attain a unified form. A flexible, problem-solving governance system was formed, together with a monarchy through which the emperor shared power with the Estates. (Note: "[...] it is a tribute to his success that what emerged by the end of his reign was not an oligarchy of princes but a strengthened monarchy", pg. 75; "The Reich emerged from the reforms of 1495 and 1500 as a polity in which the emperor and the Estates coexisted, but also competed, in uneasy equilibrium", pg. 95.) Whether the reforms equated to successful nation building is debated.

=== Reformation ===
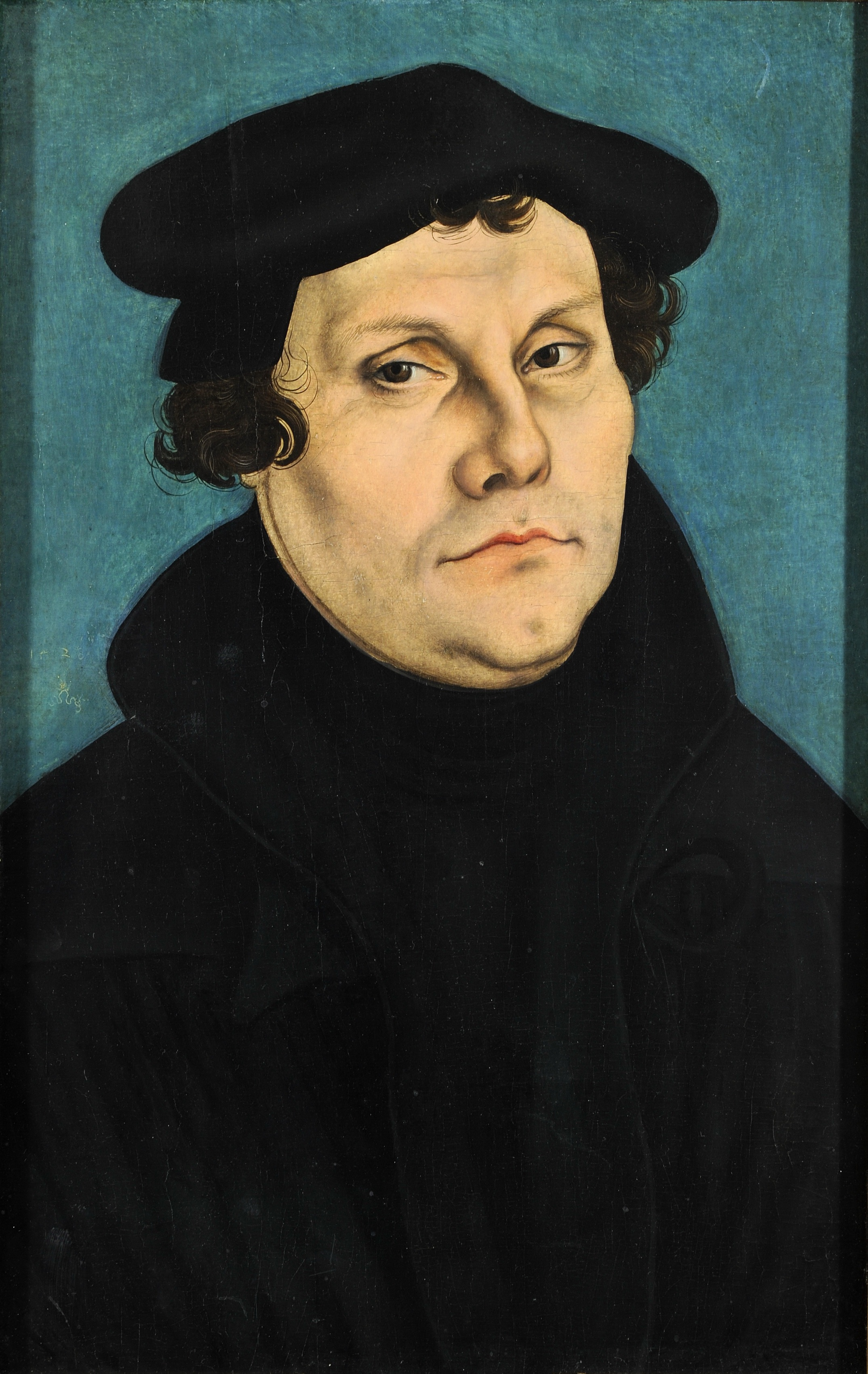
Martin Luther challenged the indulgences of the Catholic Church, giving rise to the Reformation and Protestantism.

To manage their increasing spending, the Renaissance Popes promoted the excessive sale of indulgences, offices and titles. In 1517, Martin Luther published a pamphlet with 95 Theses and sent copies to members of the political elite. The list detailed assertions of misconduct within the Church. He received popular support for his condemnation of the sale of indulgences, and the pope's abuse of power. The Reformation successfully challenged the Catholic Church, its ideas spread rapidly, as the new technology of the modern printing press ensured cheap mass copies and distribution. With the Protestation at Speyer of the Lutheran princes in 1529 and the adoption of the Lutheran Augsburg Confession by the princes beginning in 1530, the separate Lutheran church was established.

The German Peasants' War between 1524-25, which began in Alsace and Swabia and spread further east into Franconia, Thuringia and Austria, was a series of economic and religious revolts of the rural classes, encouraged by the rhetoric of radical religious reformers and Anabaptists against the feudal lords. Although occasionally assisted by war-experienced noblemen, peasant forces lacked military structure, skill, logistics and equipment and as many as 100,000 were killed by the princes.

The Catholic Counter-Reformation began in 1545 at the Council of Trent. Its intent was to challenge the Reformation via polemical writings and decrees, ecclesiastical reconfiguration, wars and political manoeuvres. The 1555 Peace of Augsburg decreed the recognition of the Lutheran Faith and religious division of the empire. It stipulated the ruler's right to determine the religion in his principality (Cuius regio, eius religio). The Counter-Reformation failed to reintegrate the German Lutheran states. In 1608 the Protestant Union was formed, followed by the Catholic League in 1609.

=== Thirty Years' War, 1618–48 ===
The Holy Roman Empire following the Peace of Westphalia in 1648

The Thirty Years' War, which took place almost exclusively in the Holy Roman Empire, had its origins in the conflicts of the Catholic and Protestant factions. The conflict was sparked by the Bohemian Revolt of the Protestant nobility against emperor Matthias' appointments. His successor Ferdinand II attempted to achieve religious and political unity of the empire, while the opposing Protestant forces were determined to defend their religious rights. The religious motive served as the justification for the territorial and foreign princes, who joined either warring party to gain land and power. The war grew to become a European conflict by the intervention of King Christian IV of Denmark, Gustavus Adolphus of Sweden, and France. The conflict evolved into a struggle between the French House of Bourbon and the House of Habsburg for predominance in Europe.

Three decades of warfare and destruction left the land devastated. Marauding armies pillaged the countryside, seized and levied heavy taxes on cities and plundered the food stocks of the peasantry. There were many bands of outlaws, sick, homeless, and displaced people. Social and economic disruption caused a dramatic decline in population as a result of murder, rape, infectious diseases, crop failures, famine, declining birth rates, and emigration. Estimates vary between a 38% drop from 16 million people in 1618 to 10 million by 1650, and a 20% drop from 20 to 16 million.

The war ended with the Peace of Westphalia, and resulted in increased autonomy for the states of the Holy Roman Empire, limiting the power of the emperor. Most of Alsace was ceded to France, Western Pomerania and Bremen-Verden were given to Sweden as Imperial fiefs, and the Netherlands left the Empire.

=== Culture and literacy ===
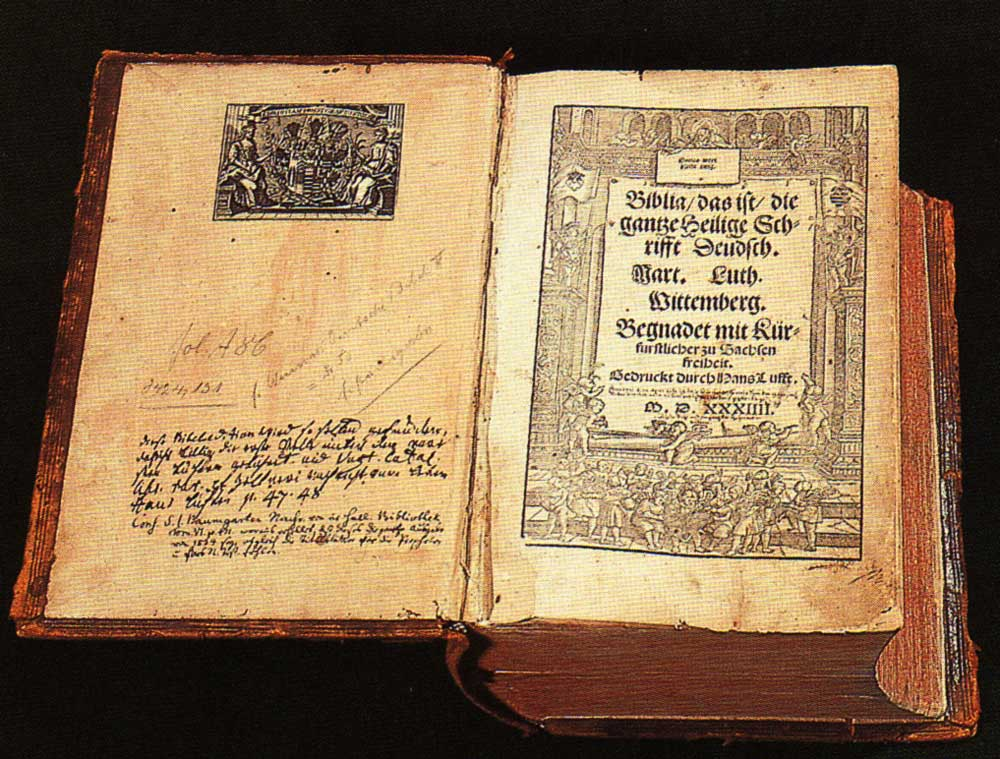
Modern High German translation of the Christian Bible by Protestant reformer Martin Luther (1534). The widespread popularity of the Luther Bible helped establish modern Standard High German.

The Reformation was a triumph for literacy and the printing press. (Note: In the end, while the Reformation emphasis on Protestants reading the Scriptures was one factor in the development of literacy, the impact of printing itself, the wider availability of printed works at a cheaper price, and the increasing focus on education and learning as key factors in obtaining a lucrative post, were also significant contributory factors.) Luther's translation of the Bible was decisive for increased literacy in early modern Germany, and stimulated printing and distribution of books and pamphlets. The Reformation instigated a media revolution as by 1530 over 10,000 individual works were published with a total of ten million copies. It became clear print could be used for propaganda. Illustrations in the newly translated Bible and in many tracts popularized ideas.

Luther's translation into High German was also decisive for the German language and its evolution from Early New High German to Modern Standard German. It promoted the development of non-local forms of language and exposed speakers to forms of German from outside their area.

=== Science ===
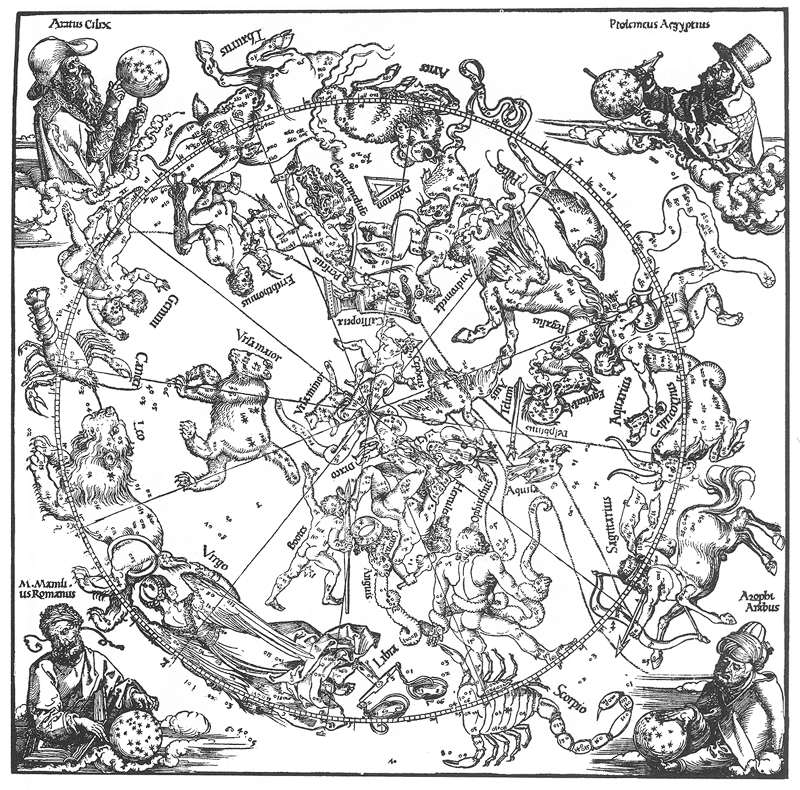
The Northern Hemisphere of the Celestial Globe created by Albrecht Dürer

Notable polymaths from this time include: Johannes Trithemius, a founder of cryptography; Conrad Celtes, a cartographic writer and humanist; Athanasius Kircher, scholar in geology and medicine; and Gottfried Wilhelm Leibniz, who contributed to many fields. Martin Waldseemüller and Matthias Ringmann's Universalis Cosmographia and the 1513 edition of Geography marked the climax of a cartography revolution.

In 1515, Johannes Stabius, Albrecht Dürer and astronomer Konrad Heinfogel produced the first planispheres of the southern and northern hemispheres, and the first printed celestial maps. Astronomer Johannes Kepler was pioneering in empirical research; through application of the Scientific method he construed his laws of planetary motion.

Scientists, scholars and artists of early modern Germany
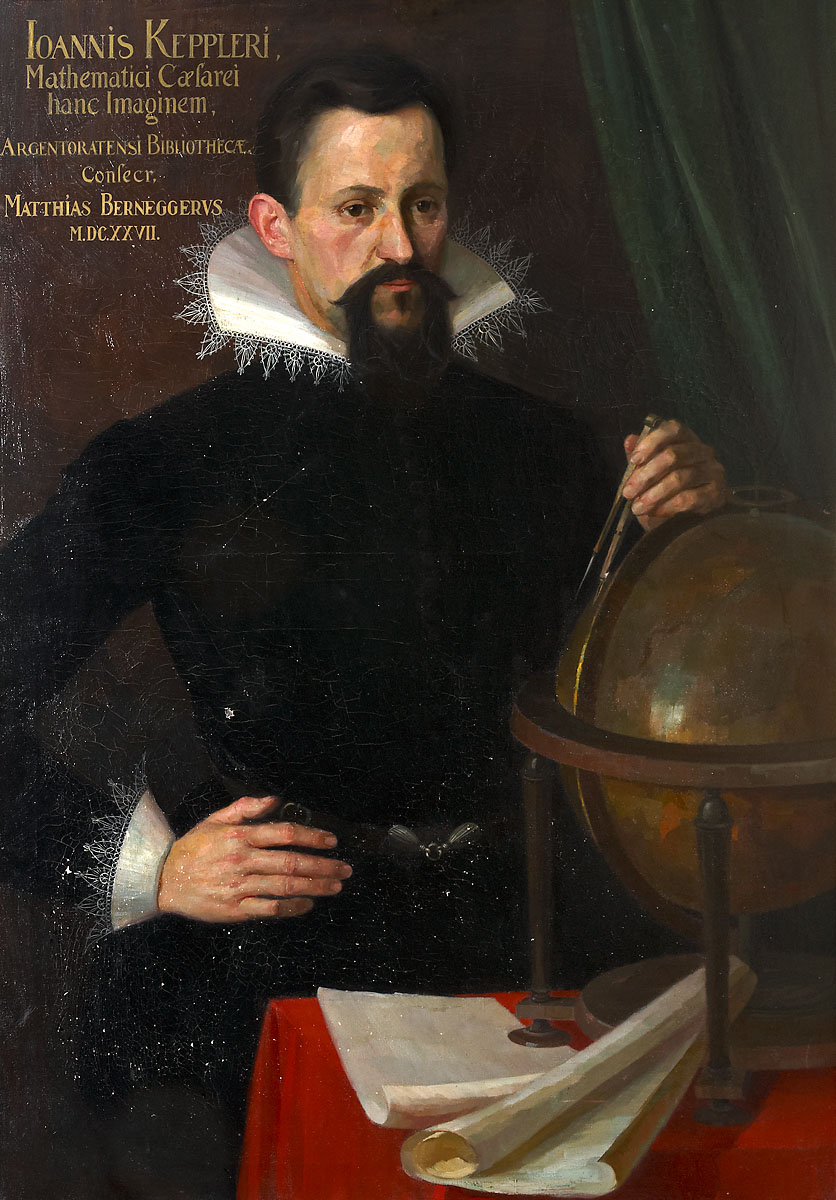
Johannes Kepler, one of the founders and fathers of modern astronomy, the scientific method, natural and modern science

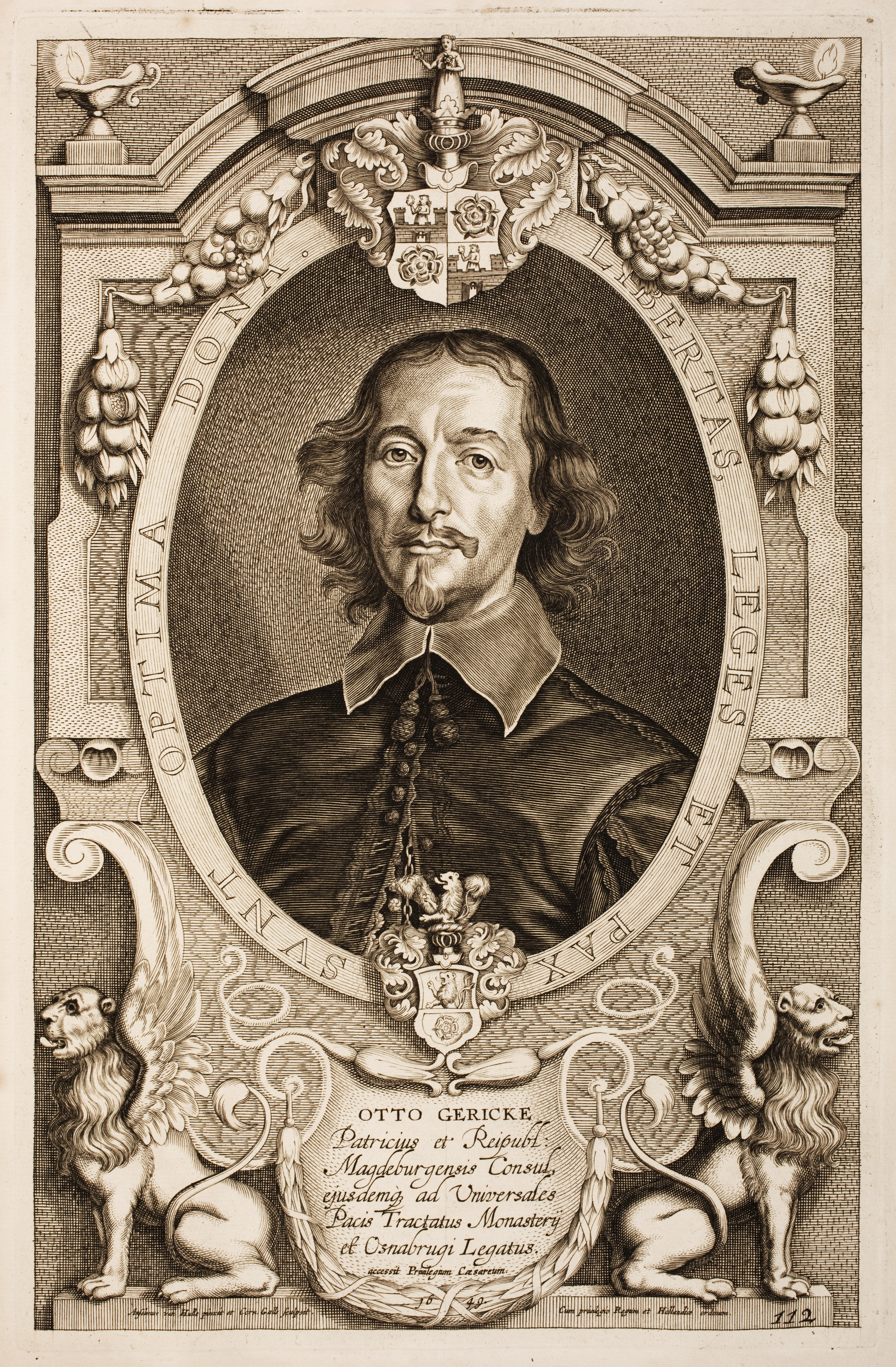
Otto von Guericke, scientist, inventor and politician, famous for demonstrating the power of atmospheric pressure with the Magdeburg hemispheres

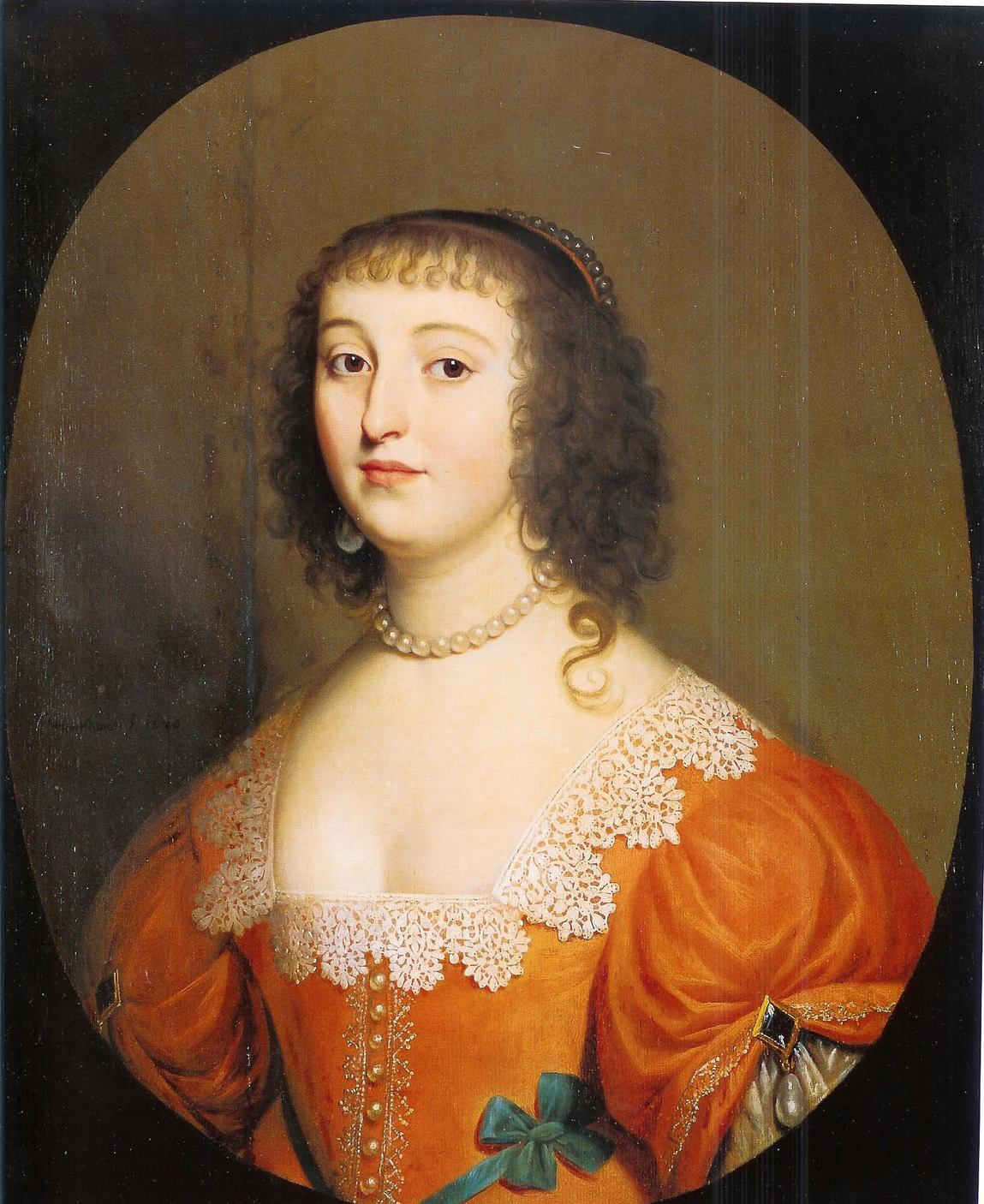
Elisabeth of the Palatinate, philosopher, critic of René Descartes' dualistic metaphysics

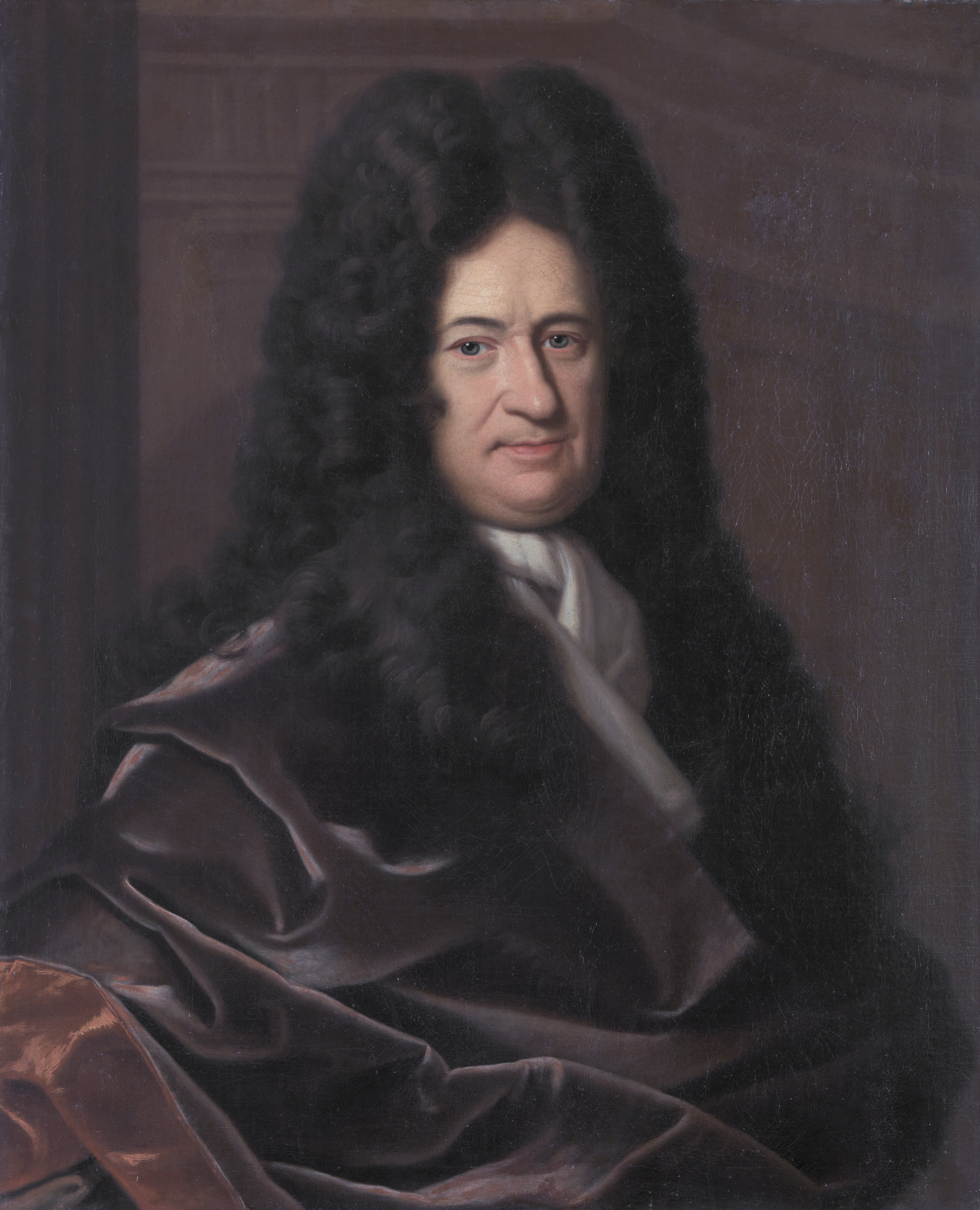
Gottfried Wilhelm Leibniz, philosopher and mathematician

== 1648–1815 ==
=== Rise of Prussia ===
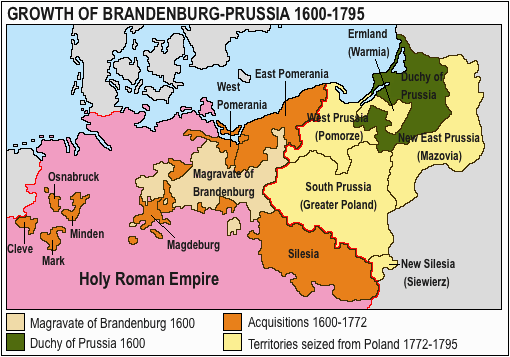
Prussia became a European great power after 1763 and Austria's greatest rival in Germany.

When Albert Frederick, Duke of Prussia died in 1618 without male heirs, John Sigismund was granted the right of succession to the Duchy of Prussia. From then Prussia was in personal union with Brandenburg. Frederick William, ruler of Brandenburg-Prussia since 1640, acquired East Pomerania in 1648. He reorganised his loose and scattered territories and managed to throw off the vassalage of Prussia under the Kingdom of Poland during the Second Northern War. To address the problem of Prussia's rural population of three million, he attracted the immigration and settlement of French Huguenots in urban areas. Many became craftsmen and entrepreneurs. King Frederick William I, who reigned from 1713 to 1740, established the structures for the centralized Prussian state and raised a professional army, which was to play a central role. He operated a command economy that some historians consider mercantilist.

The population of Germany (in its 1914 territorial extent) grew from 16 million in 1700 to 17 million in 1750, and 24 million in 1800. The 18th-century economy noticeably profited from widespread practical application of the scientific method as greater yields, more reliable agricultural production, and the introduction of hygienic standards positively affected the birth rate – death rate balance.

=== Wars ===
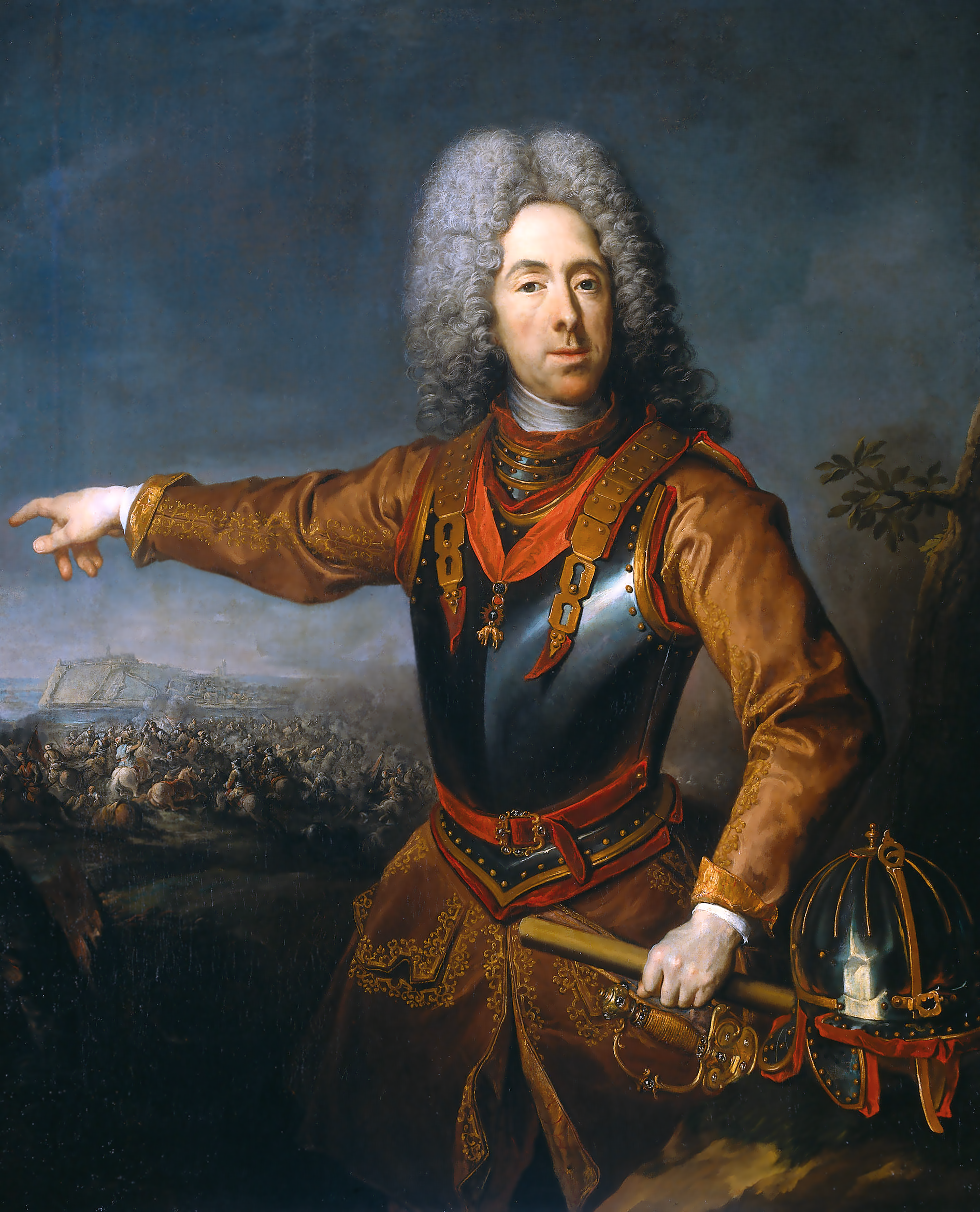
Prince Eugene of Savoy, Austrian commander during the Austro-Turkish wars

France's Louis XIV occupied Lorraine (1670) and annexed Alsace (1678–81) which included Straßburg. At the start of the Nine Years' War, he invaded the Electorate of the Palatinate (1688–97). The Grand Alliance of 1689 took up arms against France and countered Louis' advances. The conflict ended in 1697 as parties realized victory was financially unattainable. The Treaty of Ryswick returned Lorraine and Luxembourg to the empire.

After the last-minute relief of Vienna from a siege and imminent seizure by an Ottoman force in 1683, the combined troops of the Holy League (1684), embarked on military containment of the Ottoman Empire. Prince Eugene of Savoy, who served under emperor Leopold I, took command in 1697 and defeated the Ottomans. Eugene ended Ottoman rule over most territorial states in the Balkans during the Austro-Turkish War of 1716–1718. This left Austria to maintain hegemony in Southeast Europe, on which the future Austrian Empire was based.

=== Enlightened absolutism ===
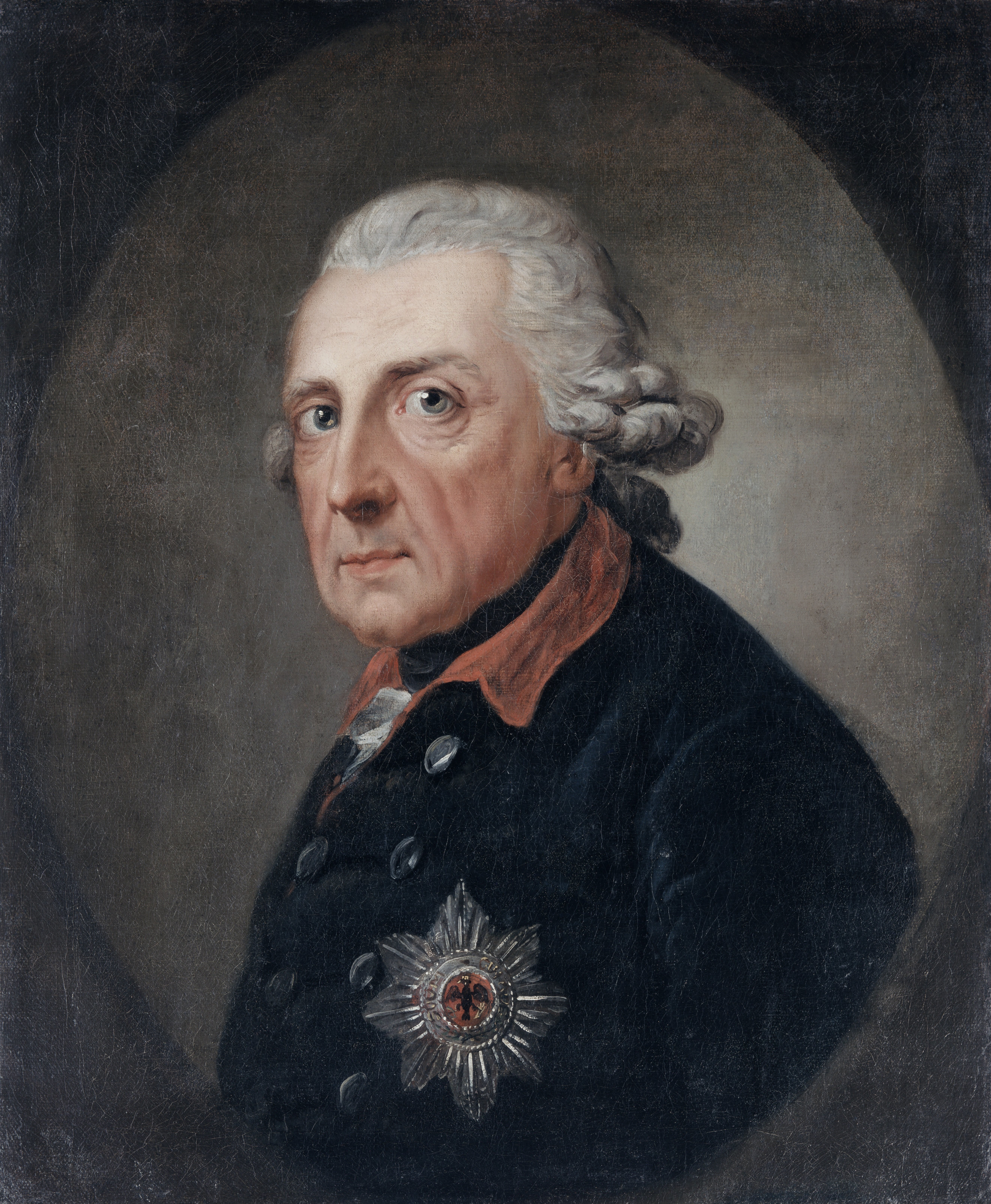
Frederick II, the Great, of Prussia reigned from 1740 to 1786.

Frederick the Great is known for his military genius and utilisation of a highly organised army to make Prussia a great power, as well as escaping from national disaster. He was an artist and philosopher, who promoted the concept of enlightened absolutism.

Austrian empress Maria Theresa succeeded in bringing about recognition of her succession through the War of the Austrian Succession from 1740 to 1748. However, Silesia was lost to Prussia as a consequence of the Silesian Wars and Seven Years' War. The 1763 Treaty of Hubertusburg ruled that Austria and Saxony had to relinquish claims to Silesia. Prussia, which had doubled its territory was recognized as a great power with the consequence that the politics of the following century were fundamentally influenced by Austro-Prussian rivalry in Central Europe. During 1772 to 1795 Prussia instigated the partitions of Poland by occupying the western territories of the former Polish–Lithuanian Commonwealth. Austria and Russia acquired the remaining lands so Poland ceased to exist until 1918.

The concept of enlightened absolutism, although rejected by the nobility and citizenry, was advocated in Prussia and Austria and implemented from 1763. Prussian king Frederick II argued that the benevolent monarch is the first servant of the state, who effects his absolute power for the benefit of the population. Legal reforms, e.g. abolition of torture and emancipation of the rural population and Jews, reorganisation of the Prussian Academy of Sciences, introduction of compulsory education for boys and girls and promotion of religious tolerance, caused rapid social and economic development. The smaller German states failed to form coalitions with each other, and were overwhelmed by Prussia, who swallowed up many between 1807-71.

=== Social changes ===
Prussia underwent major social change between the mid-17th and mid-18th centuries as the traditional aristocracy struggled to compete with the rising merchant class, which developed into a new Bourgeoisie middle class. The emancipation of the serfs granted the rural peasantry land purchasing rights and freedom of movement, and agrarian reforms in northwest Germany abolished feudal obligations and divided up feudal land, giving rise to wealthier peasants and a more efficient rural economy.

=== Enlightenment ===
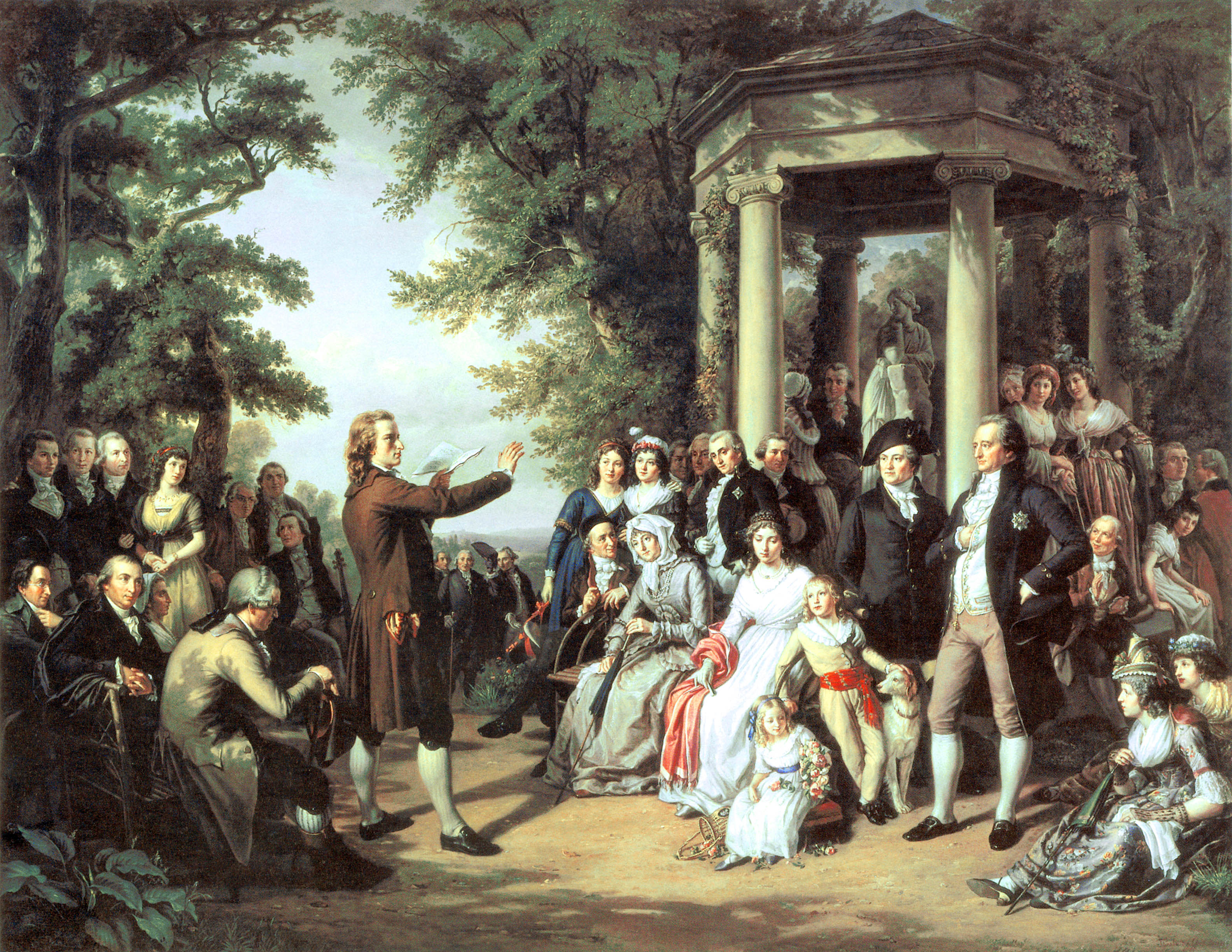
Painting of the Weimar courtyard of the muses, depicting an elite fellowship of nobles and commoners, courtiers, civil servants, writers, artists and scientists among Schiller, Wieland, Herder and Goethe – in Classical Weimar, by Theobald von Oer, 1860

During the mid-18th century, the recognition and application of Enlightenment cultural, intellectual and spiritual ideals, led to a flourishing of art, music, philosophy, science and literature.

In 1685, Frederick William of Prussia issued the Edict of Potsdam a week after French Louis XIV's Edict of Fontainebleau, which abolished free religious practice for Huguenots. William offered his co-religionists, who are oppressed...a secure and free refuge.... 20,000 Huguenots arrived and settled in the cities. The nobility and middle-class of the German states increasingly used French in public conversation. Prussians had the skills for the application of pan-European Enlightenment ideas to develop more rational political and administrative institutions. Saxony carried out reforms aided by its strong urban structure and influential commercial groups.

German music came of age under composers Johann Sebastian Bach, Joseph Haydn, and Wolfgang Amadeus Mozart. Johann Gottfried Herder broke ground in philosophy and poetry, as a leader of the Sturm und Drang movement of proto-Romanticism. Weimar Classicism was a cultural movement that established a new humanism by synthesizing Romantic, classical, and Enlightenment ideas. The movement, from 1772 until 1805, involved polymath Johann Wolfgang von Goethe and playwright Friedrich Schiller. Herder argued every folk had its own identity, expressed in its language and culture. This legitimized the promotion of German language and culture, and helped shape German nationalism. Schiller's plays expressed the restless spirit of his generation, depicting the hero's struggle against social pressures and the force of destiny.

Philosopher Immanuel Kant tried to reconcile rationalism and religious belief, individual freedom, and political authority. The ideas of the Enlightenment, and their implementation, received recognition as the principal cause for cultural progress.

=== French Revolution, 1789–1815 ===
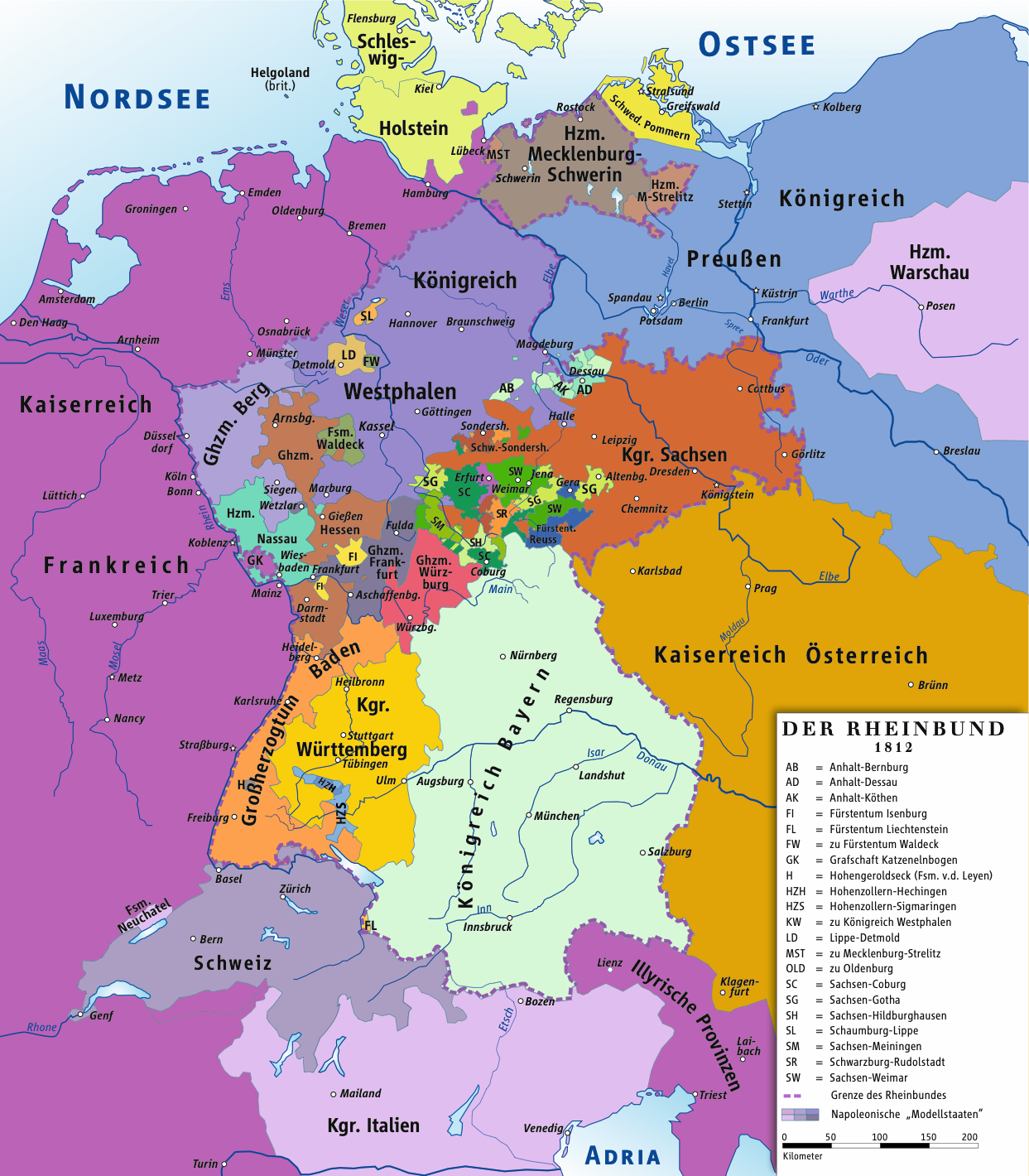
The Confederation of the Rhine, a union of client states of the First French Empire (1806 to 1813)

German reaction to the French Revolution was mixed. Intellectuals celebrated, hoping to see the triumph of Reason and the Enlightenment. The royal courts in Vienna and Berlin denounced the overthrow of the king and the spread of notions of liberty, equality, and fraternity. By 1793, the execution of the French king and onset of the Terror disillusioned the educated middle classes. Reformers said the solution was to have faith in the ability of Germans to reform their laws and institutions peacefully.

War broke out in 1792 as Austria and Prussia invaded France, but were defeated at the Battle of Valmy. The German lands saw armies marching back and forth, bringing devastation, but also new ideas of liberty and civil rights.

==== French control ====
France took control of the Rhineland, imposed French-style reforms, abolished feudalism, established constitutions, promoted freedom of religion, emancipated Jews, opened the bureaucracy to citizens of talent, and forced the nobility to share power with the rising middle class. Napoleon created the Kingdom of Westphalia as a model state. These reforms proved permanent and modernized the west of Germany. When the French tried to impose the French language, German opposition grew. A Second Coalition of Britain, Russia, and Austria attacked France but failed. Napoleon abolished the Holy Roman Empire in 1806, while forming new countries under his control. Napoleon set up the "Confederation of the Rhine", comprising most German states except Prussia and Austria.

Under Frederick William II's weak rule (1786–97) Prussia had undergone economic, political and military decline. His successor Frederick William III tried to remain neutral during the War of the Third Coalition and French emperor Napoleon's dissolution of the Holy Roman Empire and reorganisation of the German principalities. Induced by the queen and a pro-war party Frederick William joined the Fourth Coalition in 1806. Napoleon easily defeated the Prussian army at the Battle of Jena and occupied Berlin. Prussia lost its recently acquired territories in west Germany, its army was reduced to 42,000 men, no trade with Britain was allowed and Berlin had to pay Paris high reparations and fund the French occupation. Saxony changed sides to support Napoleon and joined the Confederation of the Rhine.

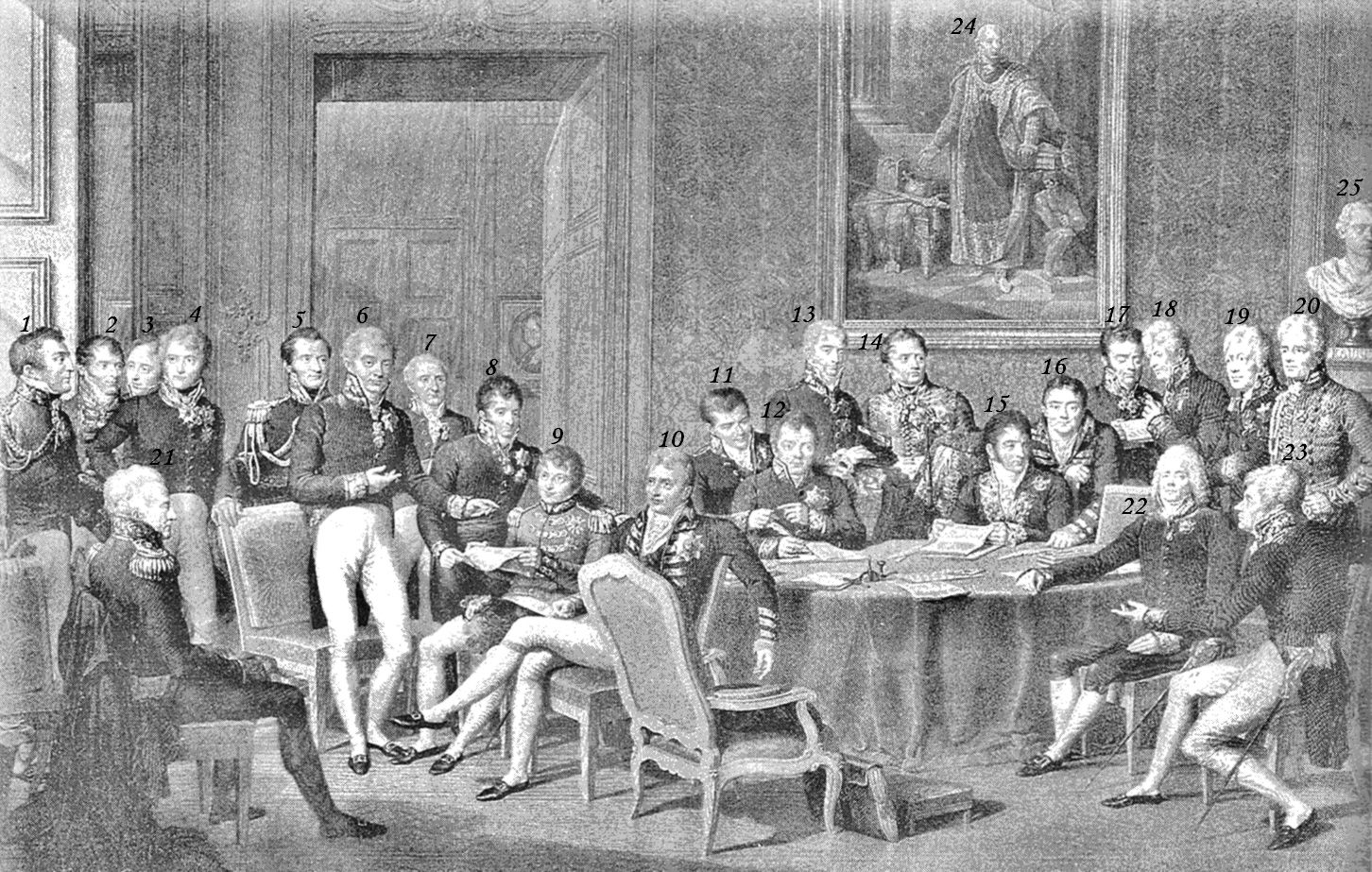
The delegates of the Congress of Vienna

After Napoleon's military fiasco in Russia in 1812, Prussia allied with Russia in the Sixth Coalition, and Austria joined the alliance. Napoleon was decisively defeated in the Battle of Leipzig in 1813. The German states of the Confederation of the Rhine defected to the Coalition against Napoleon, who rejected any peace terms. Coalition forces invaded France in 1814, Paris fell and Napoleon surrendered. Prussia as one of the winners at the Congress of Vienna, gained extensive territory.

== 1815–71 ==
=== German Confederation ===
The German Confederation 1815–1866. Prussia, in blue, considerably expanded its territory.

In 1815, Europe was turbulent and exhausted, as a consequence of the French Revolutionary and Napoleonic Wars. Following Napoleon's defeat, statesmen convened at the Congress of Vienna for the reorganisation of Europe, under the leadership of Austria's Prince Metternich. The political principles agreed upon included the restoration, legitimacy and solidarity of rulers for the repression of revolutionary and nationalist ideas. The victorious members of the Coalition negotiated a peaceful balance of powers, and agreed to maintain a stable German heartland to keep French imperialism at bay. However, the idea of reforming the defunct Holy Roman Empire was discarded. Napoleon's reorganisation of the German states was continued and princes were allowed to keep their titles.

The German Confederation (German: Deutscher Bund) was founded, a loose union of 39 states under Austrian leadership, with a Federal Diet (German: Bundestag) meeting in Frankfurt am Main. It was a coalition for mutual defence that failed to satisfy nationalists. Attempts at economic integration and customs coordination were frustrated by repressive anti-national policies. Britain approved of the union, convinced that a stable entity in central Europe could discourage aggression by France or Russia. However, the Confederation was weak, ineffective and an obstacle to German nationalism.

=== Society and economy ===
Increasingly after 1815, a centralized Prussian government, in Berlin, took over the powers of the nobles, who had controlled the peasantry. To help the nobility avoid indebtedness, Berlin set up a credit institution to provide loans in 1809, and extended the loan network to peasants in 1849. When the German Empire was established in 1871, the Junker nobility controlled the army, navy, bureaucracy, and royal court; they generally set government policies.

==== Population ====
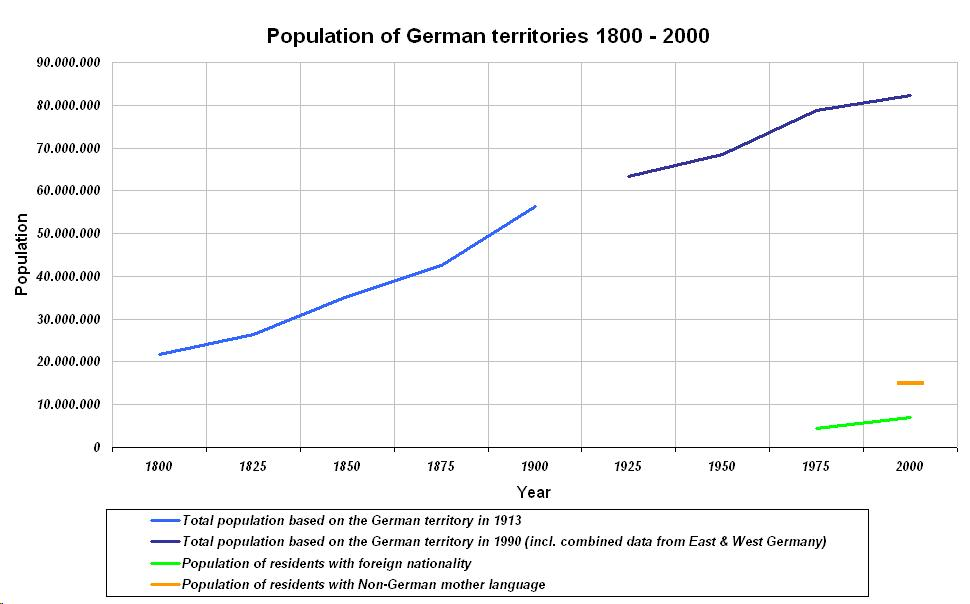
Population of German territories 1800–2000

Between 1815-65 the population of the German Confederation (excluding Austria) grew 60% from 21 to 34 million. Simultaneously the Demographic Transition took place as the high birth and death rates of the pre-industrial country shifted to low rates in the fast-growing industrialized urban economic and agricultural systems. Increased agricultural productivity secured a steady food supply, as famines and epidemics declined. This allowed people to marry earlier, and have more children. The birthrate was offset by a high rate of infant mortality and after 1840, large-scale emigration to America. Emigration totalled 480,000 in the 1840s, 1,200,000 in the 1850s, and 780,000 in the 1860s. The upper and middle classes first practiced birth control, soon to be universally adopted.

==== Industrialization ====
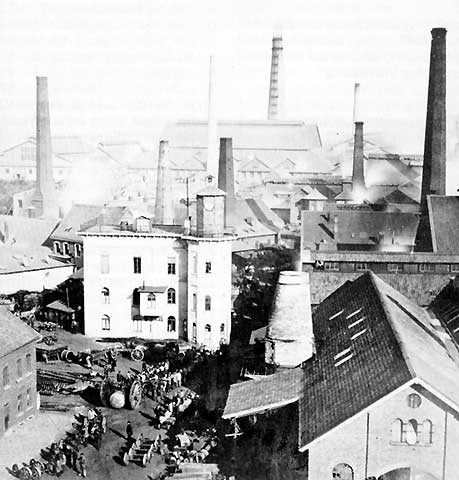
The Krupp works in Essen, 1864

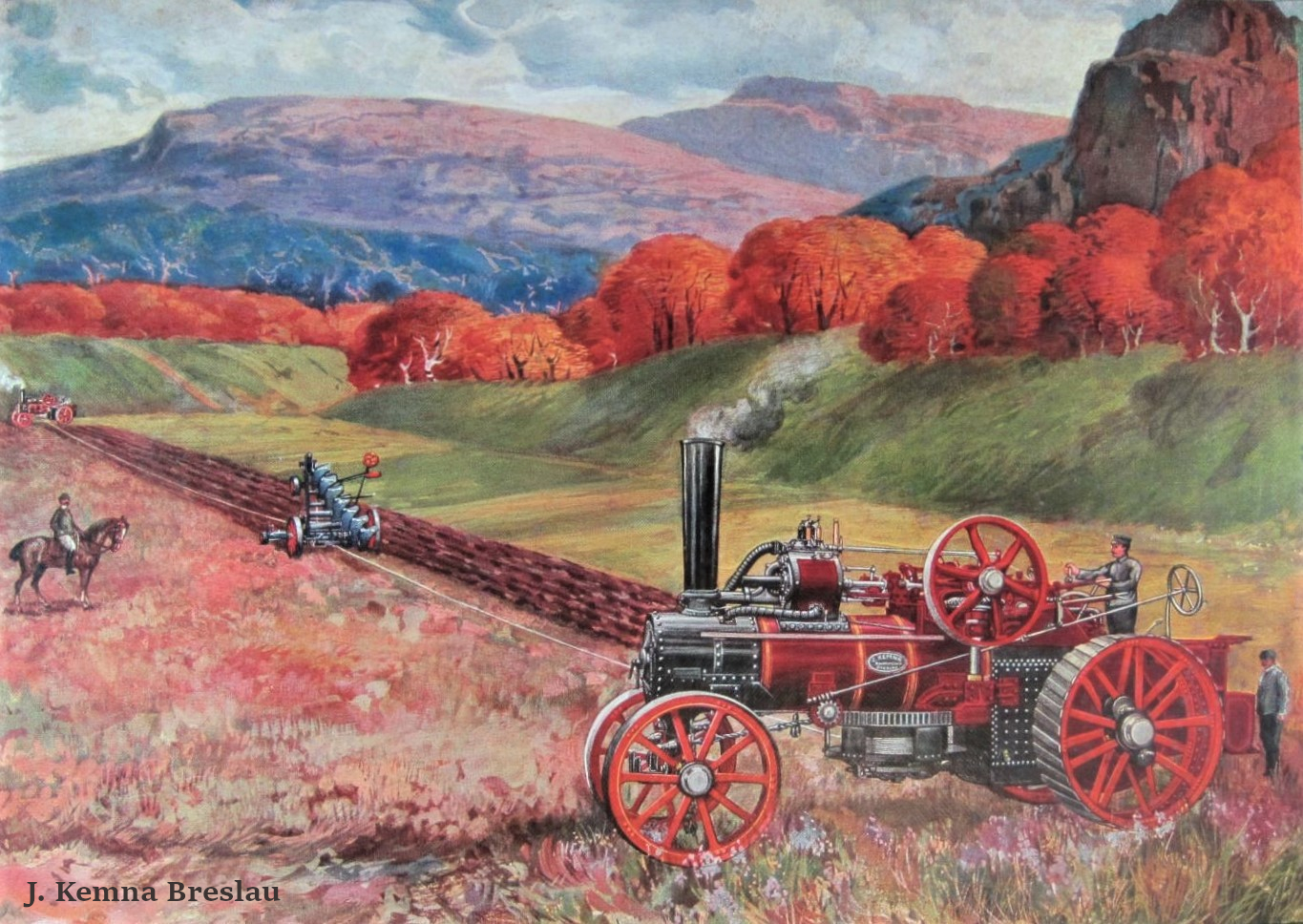
Many companies, such as steam-machine producer J. Kemna, modelled themselves on English industry.

In 1800, Germany's social structure was poorly suited to entrepreneurship and economic development. Napoleonic control produced important institutional reforms, such as abolition of feudal restrictions on the sale of large landed estates, reduction in the power of the guilds, and more efficient commercial law.

The Industrial Revolution was in full swing in Britain and France. The small German states developed slowly and autonomously. Early investments in the railways during the 1830s came from private investors. Industrialization only took off after 1850, in the wake of railway construction. The textile industry grew rapidly, profiting from the elimination of tariff barriers by the Zollverein. During the second half of the 19th century German industry grew exponentially and by 1900, Germany was an industrial world leader along with Britain and the US.

==== Urbanization ====
In 1800, the population was predominantly rural, only 10% lived in communities of 5,000 or more, and only 2% lived in cities of more than 100,000. After 1815, the urban population grew, due to the influx of young people from rural areas. Berlin grew from 172,000 in 1800, to 826,000 inhabitants in 1870, and Munich from 40,000 to 269,000.

==== Railways ====
The initial stage of economic development came with the railroad revolution in the 1840s, which opened up new markets for local products, created a pool of middle managers, increased the demand for engineers, architects and machinists and stimulated investments in coal and iron. Political disunity among the states and pervasive conservatism made it difficult to build railways in the 1830s. However, by the 1840s, trunk lines did link the major cities; each German state was responsible for the lines within its own borders.

Lacking a technological base, engineering and hardware was imported from Britain. In many cities, the new railway shops were the centres of technological awareness and training so, by 1850, Germany was self-sufficient in meeting the demands of railroad construction, and the railways were a major impetus for the growth of the steel industry. German unification in 1870 stimulated consolidation, nationalisation into state-owned companies, and further rapid growth. Unlike France, the goal was to support industrialisation. Eventually lines criss-crossed the Ruhr area and other industrial centres and provided good connections to the major ports of Hamburg and Bremen.

==== Science and culture ====
19th-century artists and intellectuals were inspired by the French Revolution, and the writers Johann Wolfgang von Goethe, Gotthold Ephraim Lessing and Friedrich Schiller. Ludwig van Beethoven was the most influential composer of the period. In opera, a new Romantic atmosphere combining supernatural terror and folkloric melodramatic plot was achieved by Richard Wagner. The Brothers Grimm collected folk stories into Grimm's Fairy Tales and are deemed founders of German studies as they initiated work on the Deutsches Wörterbuch ("The German Dictionary"), the most comprehensive work on German.

Professors developed international reputations which brought a new historical perspective to the study of history, theology, philosophy, language, and literature. With Georg Wilhelm Friedrich Hegel, Friedrich Wilhelm Joseph Schelling, Arthur Schopenhauer, Friedrich Nietzsche, Max Weber, Karl Marx, Friedrich Engels and Leopold von Ranke, German scholars became famous. By the 1830s German mathematics, physics, chemistry, and biology had emerged with world class science, led by Alexander von Humboldt in natural science and Carl Friedrich Gauss in mathematics.

German artists, scientists and philosophers
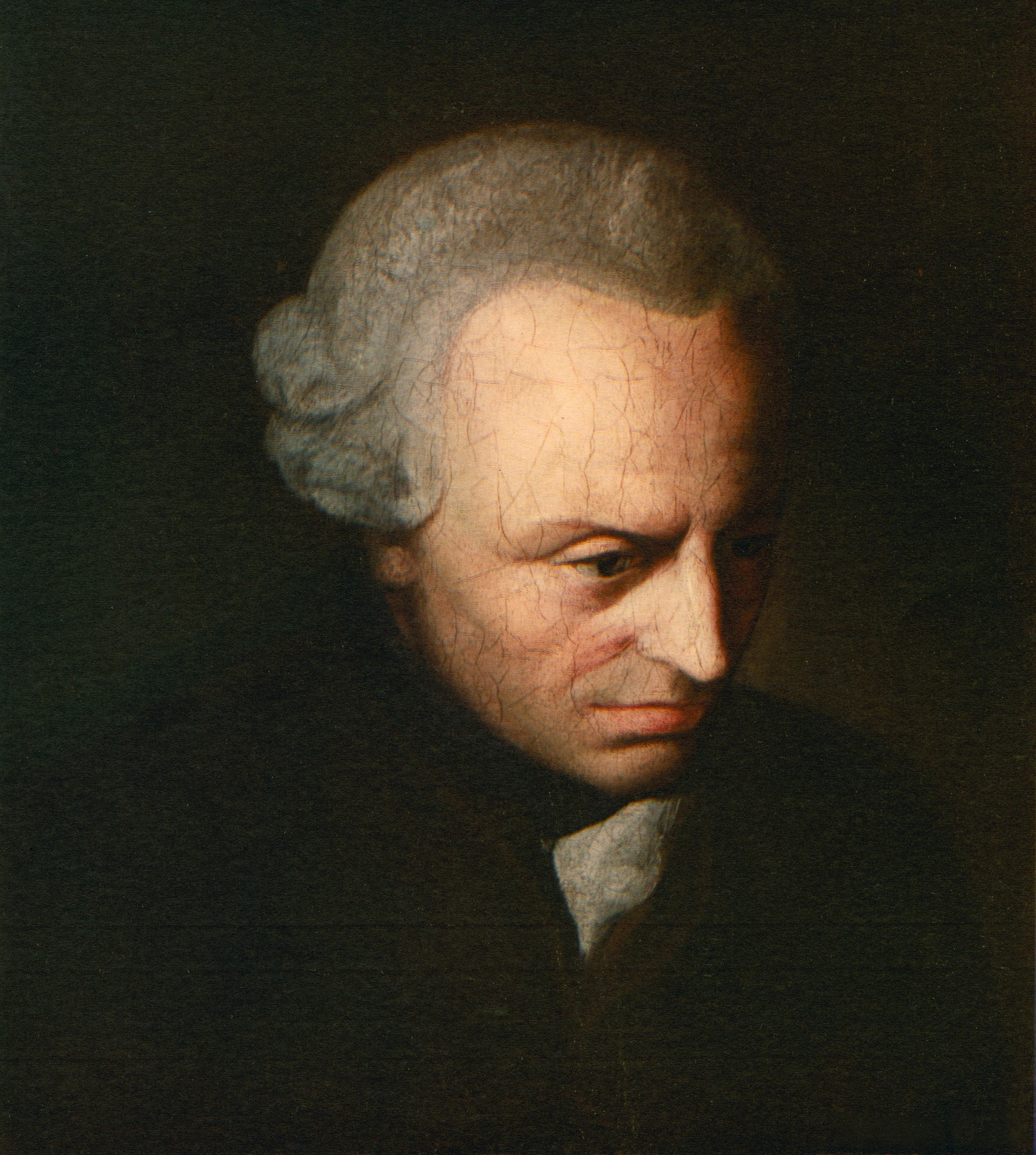
Immanuel Kant

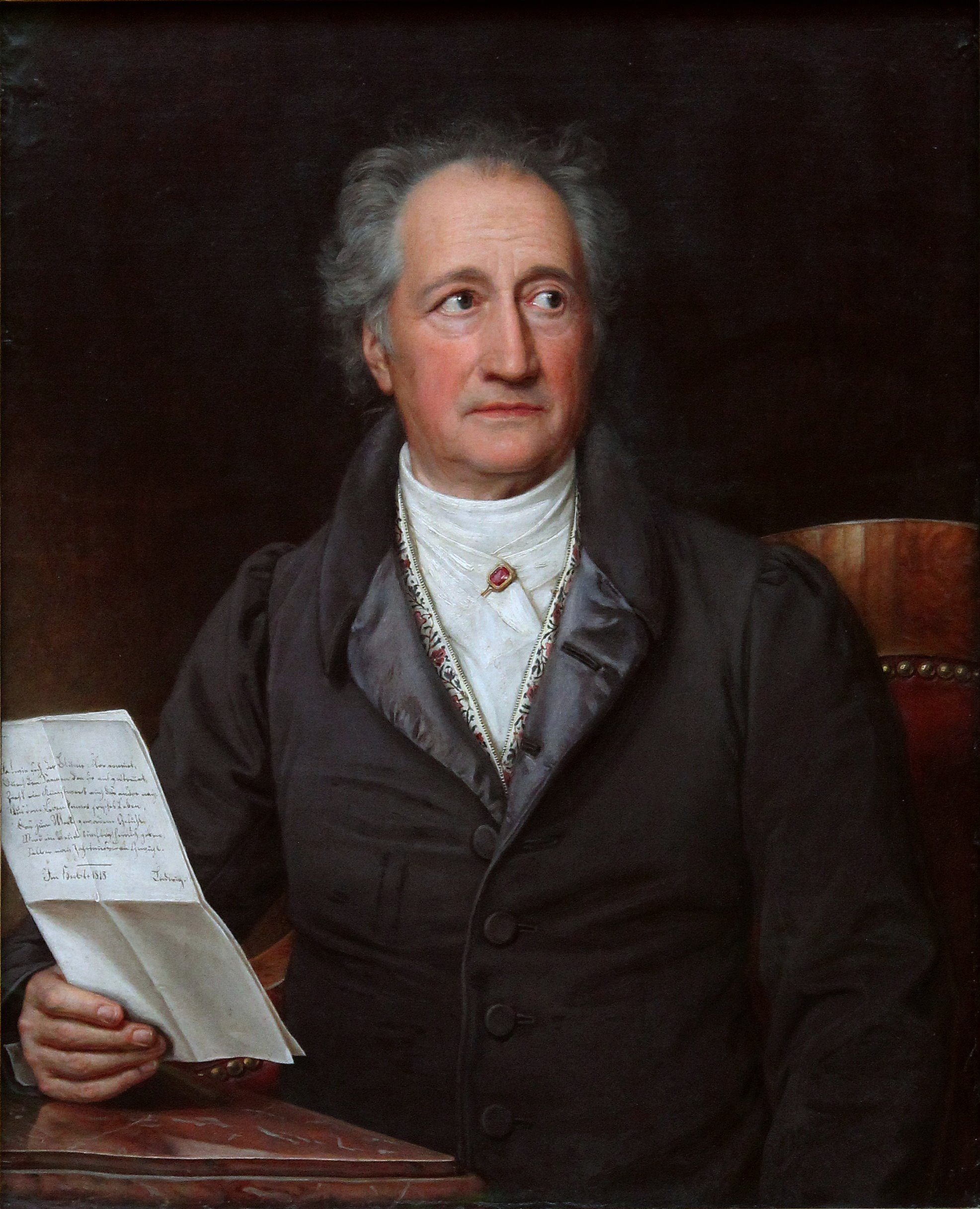
Johann Wolfgang von Goethe

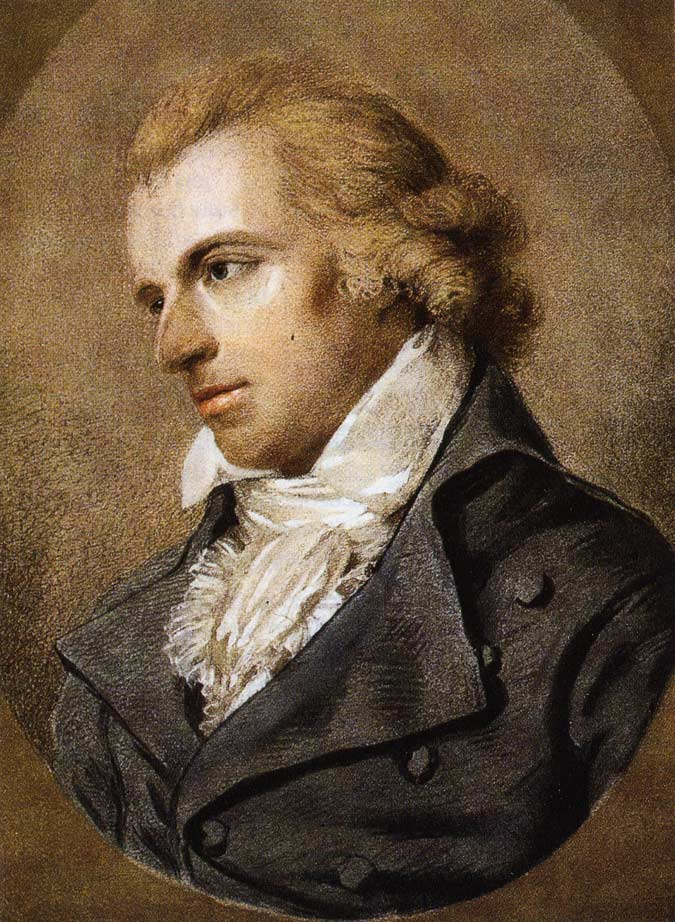
Friedrich Schiller

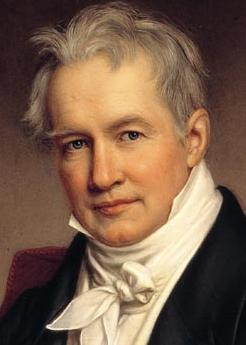
Alexander von Humboldt

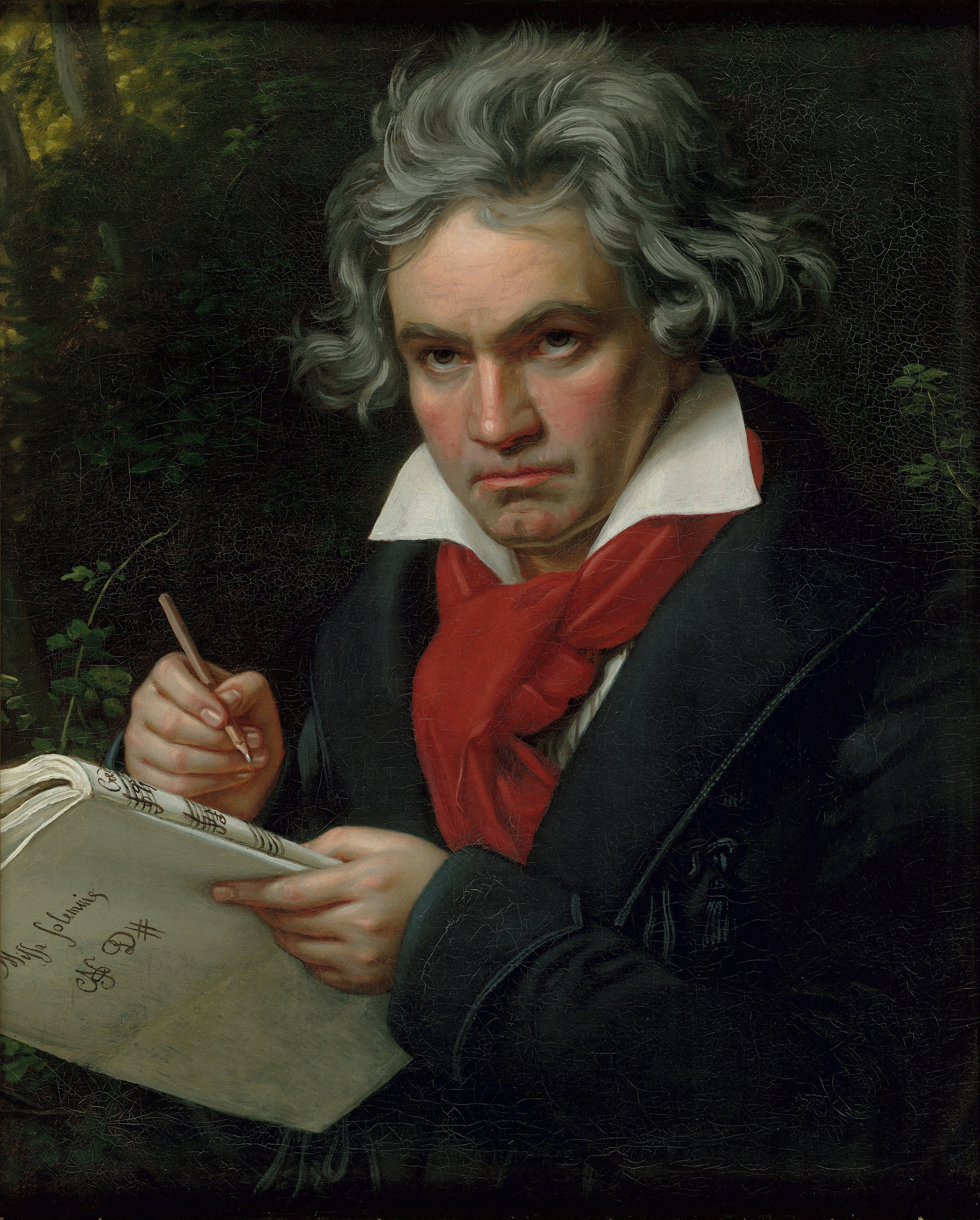
Ludwig van Beethoven

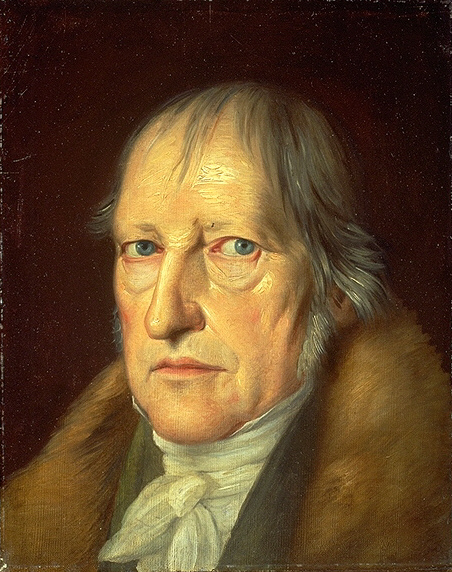
Friedrich Hegel

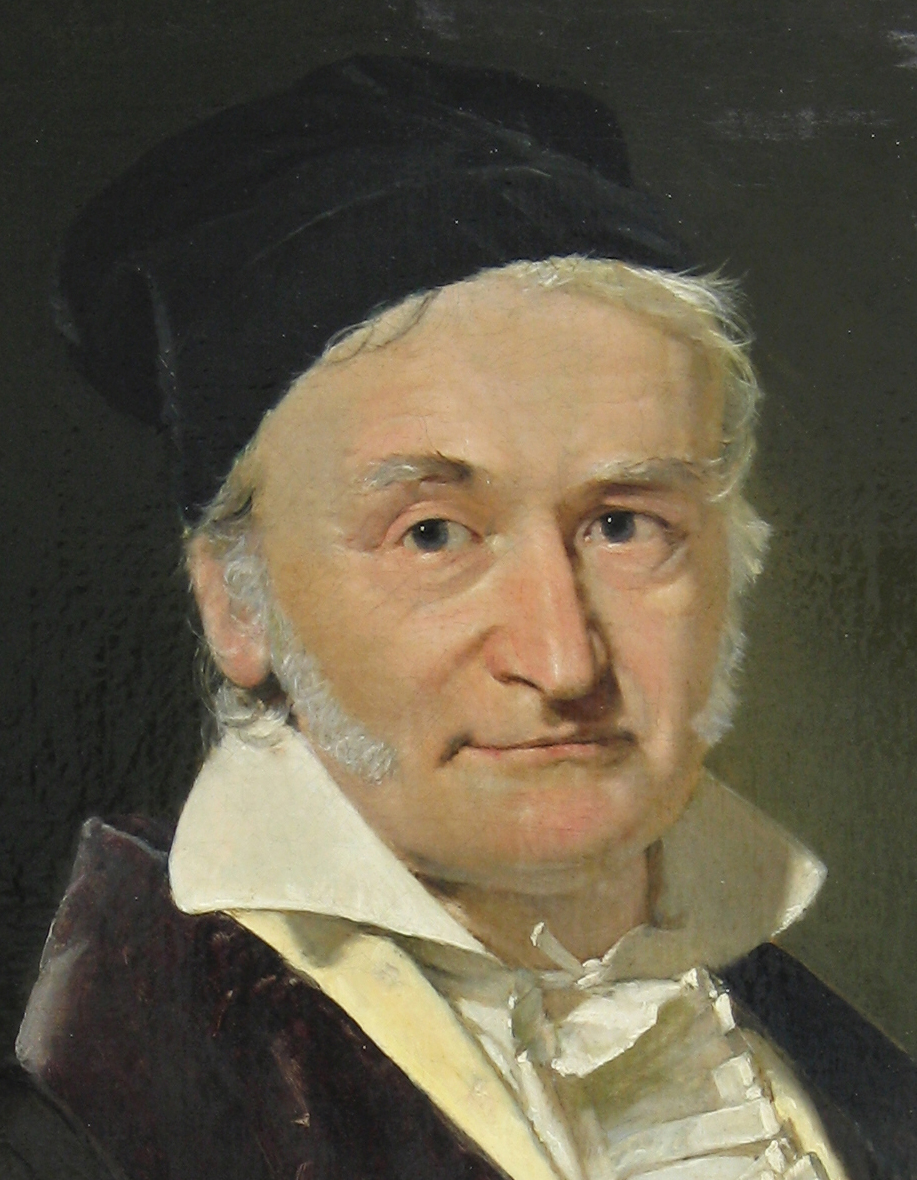
Carl Friedrich Gauss

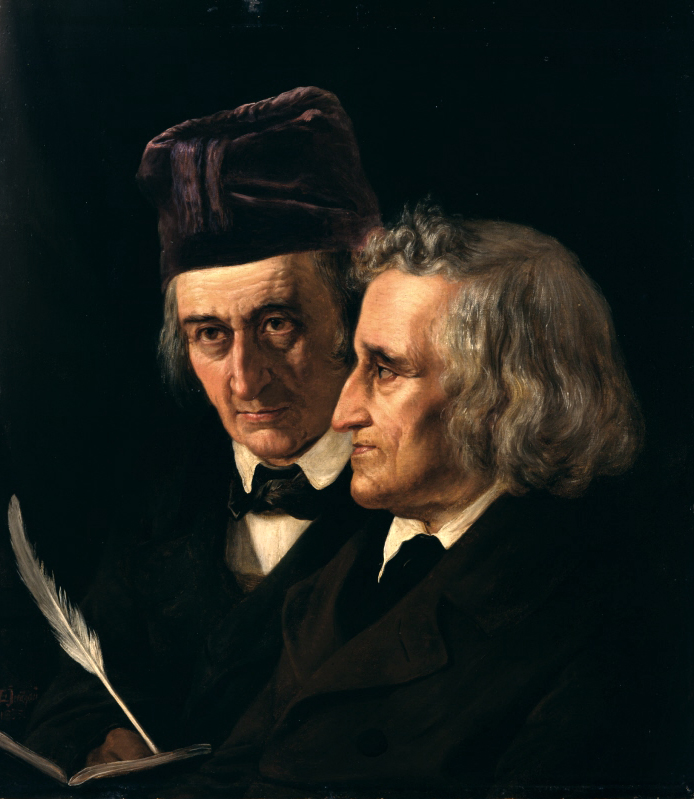
Brothers Grimm

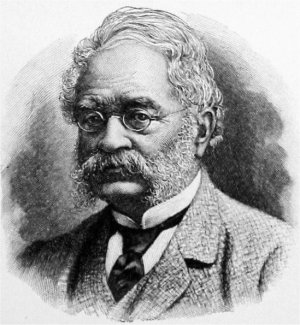
Werner von Siemens

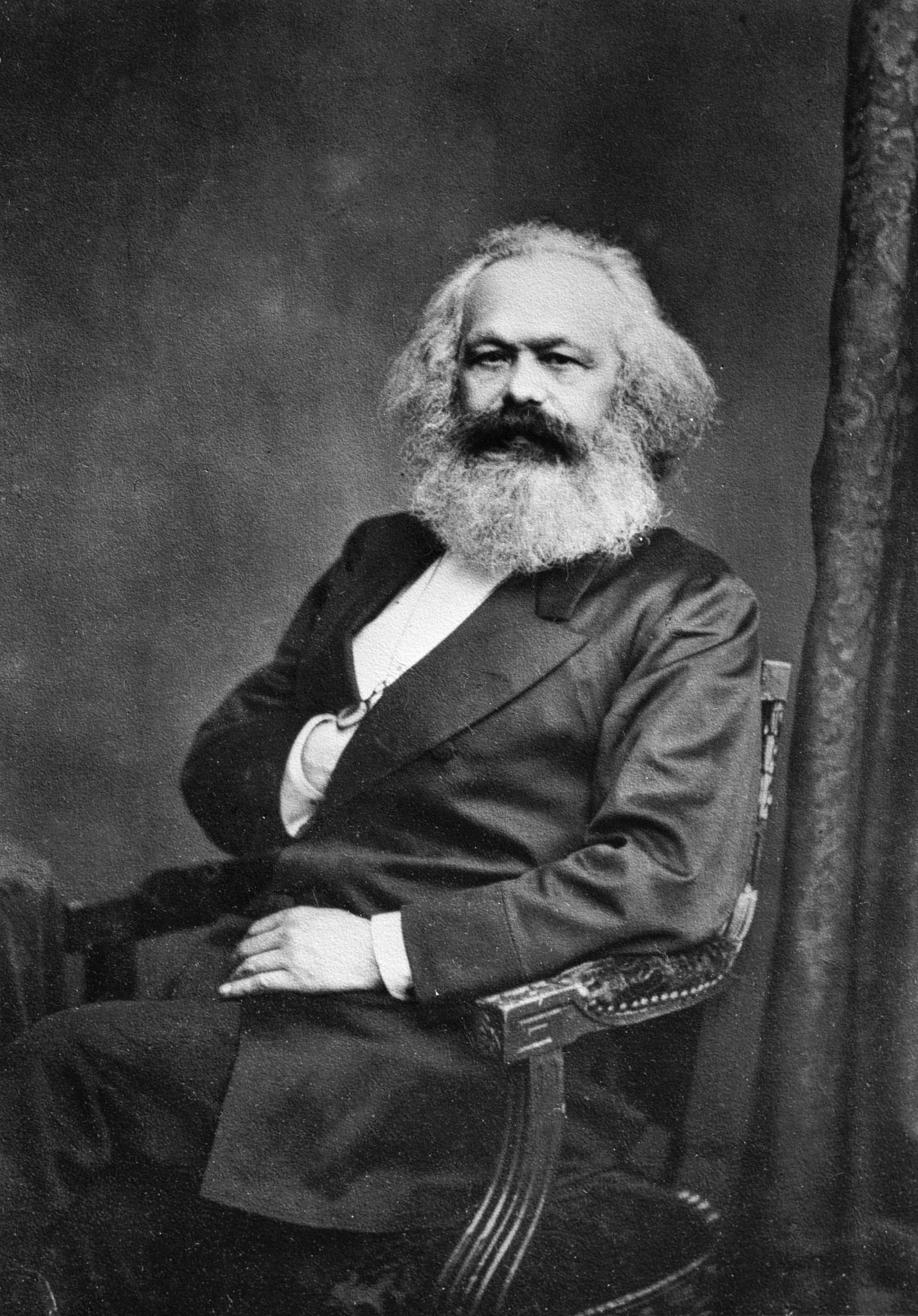
Karl Marx

==== Religion ====
There was a movement to unite the Lutheran and Reformed Protestant churches. The churches brought this about in Baden, Nassau, and Bavaria. In Prussia, Frederick William III's goal was to impose a standardized liturgy, organisation, and architecture, to centralize royal control: the Church of the Prussian Union was formed. Opposition came from the "Old Lutherans" in Silesia. The government attempted to crack down, so tens of thousands migrated. In 1845 a new king Frederick William IV offered an amnesty and allowed the Old Lutherans to form a church association.

There was a shift to more personalized religiosity, that focused on the individual more than the church or ceremony. Rationalism faded, and there was a new emphasis on the psychology and feeling of the individual, especially in contemplating sinfulness, redemption, and the mysteries and revelations of Christianity. Pietistic revivals were common among Protestants. Among Catholics there was an increase in pilgrimages. German bishops had been largely independent of Rome, but now the Vatican increased control, a new "ultramontanism" of Catholics loyal to Rome. A controversy erupted in 1837 in the Catholic Rhineland over the religious education of children of mixed marriages. In 1840, Frederick William IV defused the controversy by agreeing to Catholic demands. However it led to a sense that Catholics needed to stick together in the face of hostile government.

=== Political developments ===
In 1819, a student radical assassinated the reactionary playwright August von Kotzebue, who had scoffed at liberal student organisations. In one of the few major actions of the German Confederation, Metternich called a conference that issued the repressive Carlsbad Decrees, designed to suppress liberal agitation against the conservative governments of the German states. The Decrees terminated the fast-fading nationalist fraternities (German: Burschenschaften), removed liberal university professors, and expanded censorship. The decrees began the "persecution of the demagogues", which was directed against individuals who were accused of spreading revolutionary and nationalist ideas.

In 1834, the Zollverein was established, a customs union between Prussia and most other German states, but excluding Austria. As industrialisation developed, the need for a unified German state with a uniform currency, legal system, and government became obvious.

==== Revolutions of 1848–49 ====
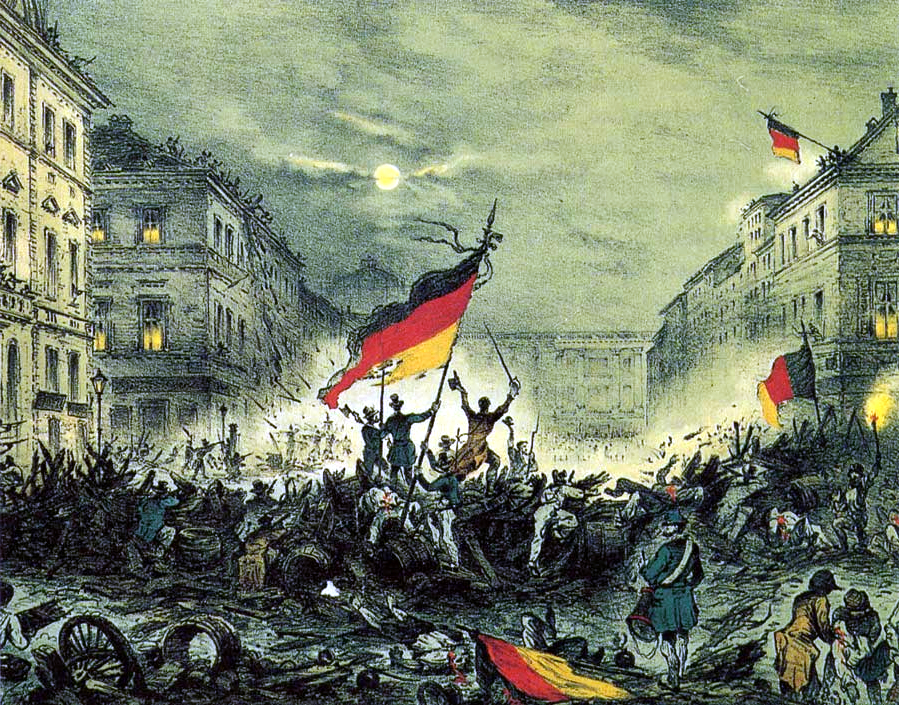
Cheering the Revolutions of 1848 in Berlin, Berlin Palace in the background. Liberal and nationalist pressure led to the unsuccessful Revolution of 1848 in the German states.

Growing discontent with the political and social order imposed by the Congress of Vienna led to the outbreak, in 1848, of the March Revolution in the German states. In May the Frankfurt National Assembly met to draw up a national German constitution. But the 1848 revolution was unsuccessful: Frederick William IV of Prussia refused the imperial crown, the Frankfurt assembly was dissolved, the ruling princes repressed the risings by force, and the German Confederation was re-established by 1850. Many leaders went into exile, including to the US and became a political force there.

The 1850s were a period of political reaction. Dissent was suppressed. Frederick William IV became depressed, and was surrounded by men who advocated clericalism and absolute divine monarchy. Prussia expanded its territory and began to industrialize rapidly, while maintaining a strong agricultural base.

==== Bismarck takes charge (1862–66) ====
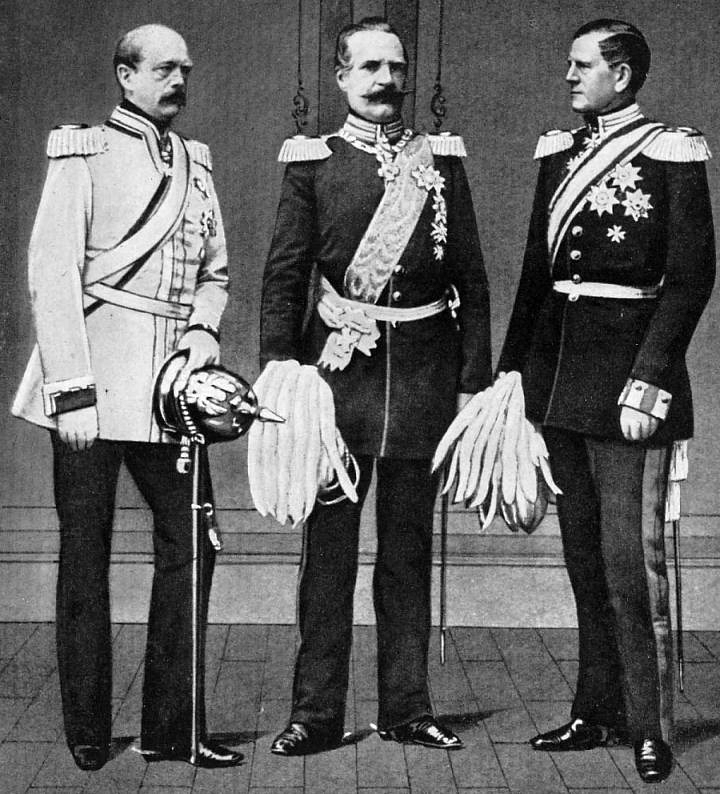
Otto von Bismarck, Albrecht von Roon and Helmut von Moltke, the senior political and military strategists of Prussia during the 1860s

In 1857, the Prussian king Frederick William IV suffered a stroke and his brother William served as regent until 1861 when he became King William I. Although conservative, William was pragmatic. His most significant accomplishment was naming Otto von Bismarck as Prussian minister president in 1862. The cooperation of Bismarck, Defense Minister Albrecht von Roon, and Field Marshal Helmuth von Moltke the Elder set the stage for military victories over Denmark, Austria, and France that led to the unification of Germany.

Disputes between Prussia and Denmark over Schleswig, which was not part of the German Confederation, and which Danish nationalists wanted to incorporate into Denmark, escalated into the Second Schleswig War in 1864. Prussia, joined by Austria, defeated Denmark and occupied Jutland. The Danes were forced to cede the Duchy of Schleswig and Duchy of Holstein to Austria and Prussia. The management of the duchies led to tensions between Austria and Prussia. Austria wanted them to become an independent entity within the German Confederation, while Prussia intended to annex them. The disagreement served as a pretext for the Austro-Prussian War that broke out in 1866. In July, the two armies clashed at Sadowa-Königgrätz in an enormous battle involving half a million men. Prussian superior logistics and breech-loading needle guns over the slow muzzle-loading rifles of the Austrians proved essential for Prussia's victory. The battle decided the struggle for hegemony in Germany, and Bismarck was lenient with a defeated Austria that would play a subordinate role in German affairs.

==== North German Confederation, 1866–71 ====
Following the Austro-Prussian War, the German Confederation was dissolved and the North German Confederation was established under the leadership of Prussia. Austria was excluded and its immense influence over Germany ended. The North German Federation was a transitional organisation that existed from 1867 to 1871, between the dissolution of the German Confederation and the founding of the German Empire.

== German Empire, 1871–1918 ==
=== Bismarck era ===
==== The new empire ====
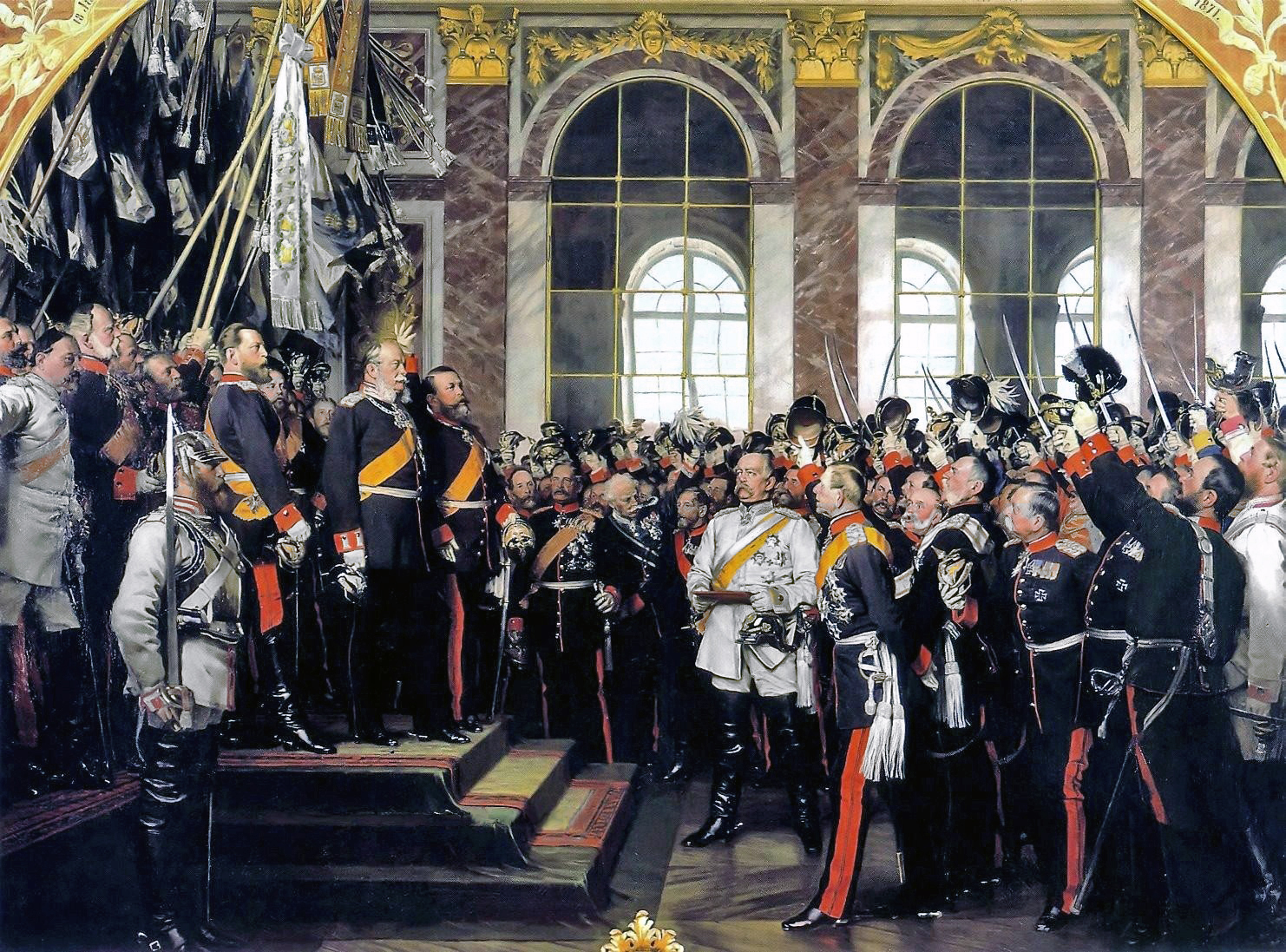
On 18 January 1871, the German Empire was proclaimed in the Hall of Mirrors of the Palace of Versailles. Bismarck in the centre in white.

In 1868, the Spanish queen Isabella II was deposed in the Glorious Revolution, leaving the throne vacant. When Prussia suggested the Hohenzollern candidate, Prince Leopold as successor, France vehemently objected. The matter evolved into a diplomatic scandal and in July 1870, France resolved to end it in a full-scale war. The conflict was quickly decided as Prussia, joined by a pan-German alliance, took the tactical initiative. Victories in France followed and a French army under Emperor Napoleon III's command capitulated in the fortress of Sedan. Napoleon was taken prisoner and a provisional government hastily proclaimed in Paris. The new government tried to reorganise the remaining armies while the Germans laid siege to Paris. The starving city surrendered in January 1871. France was forced to pay indemnities of 5 billion francs and cede Alsace-Lorraine to Germany. This left the French psyche humiliated and aggravated the French–German enmity.

During the siege, German princes assembled in the Hall of Mirrors of the Palace of Versailles on 18 January 1871, announced the establishment of the German Empire and proclaimed the Prussian King Wilhelm I as German Emperor. This unified all ethnic German states with the exception of Austria in the Lesser Germany solution of a federal economic, political and administrative unit. Bismarck was appointed Chancellor.

==== A federal empire ====
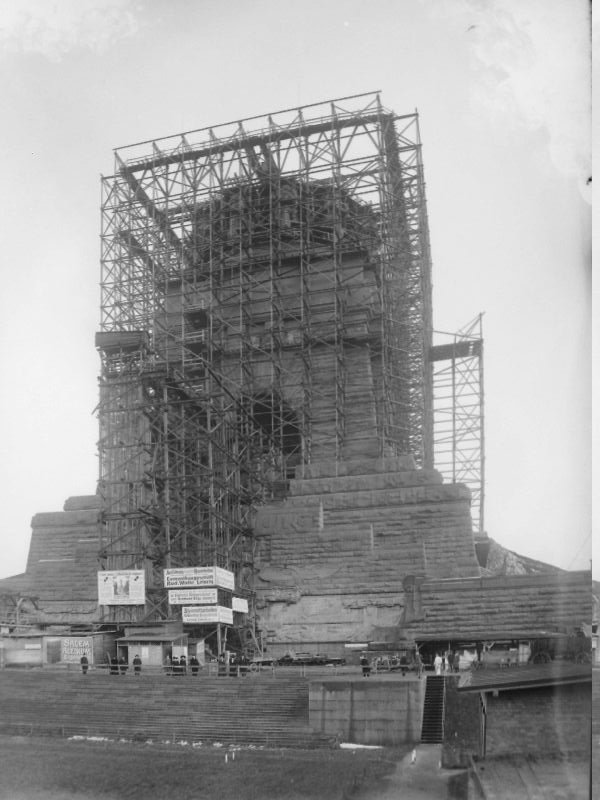
The 91 m (299 ft) high Monument to the Battle of the Nations under construction, Leipzig, 1912

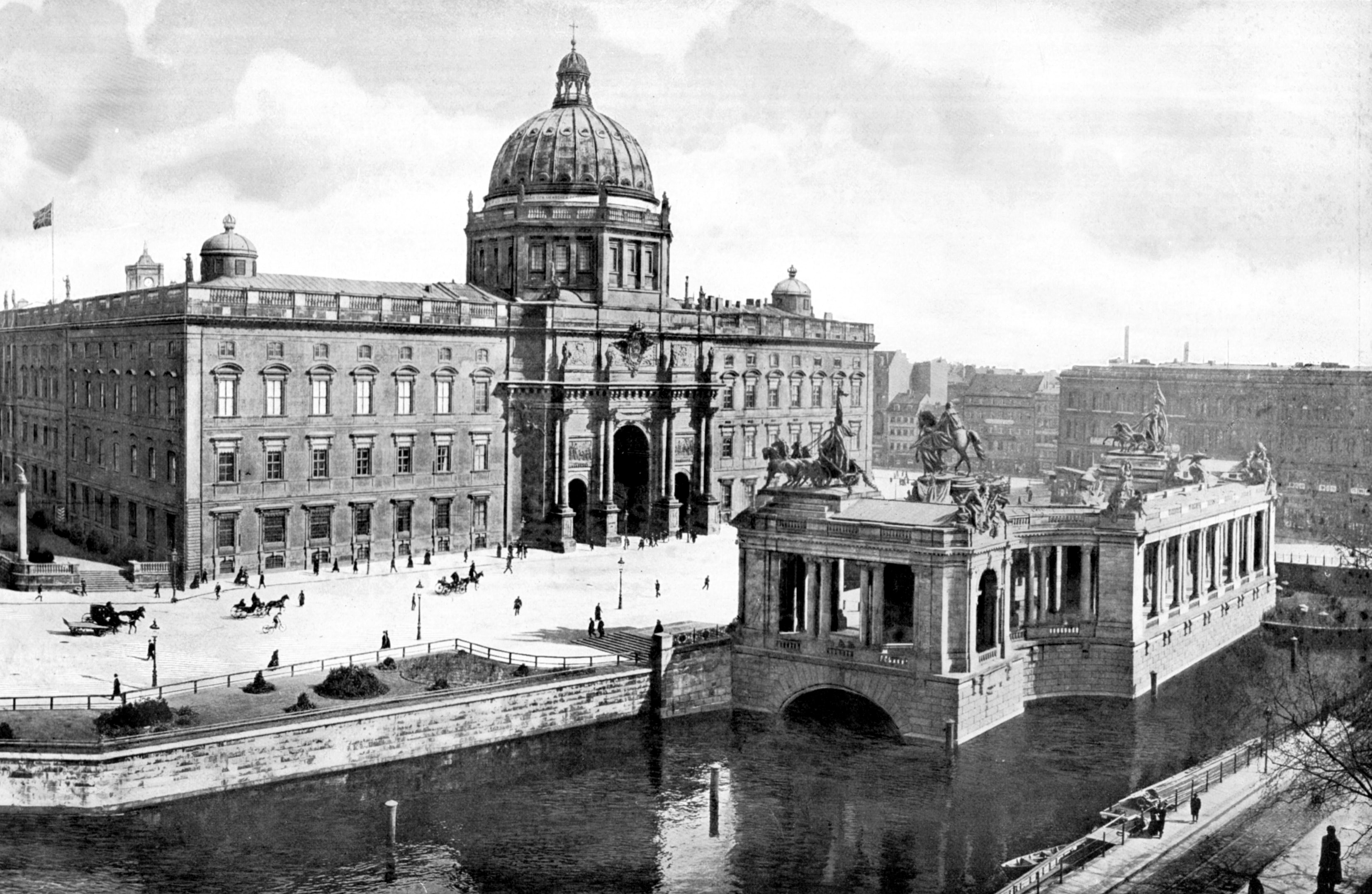
Berlin Palace, the main residence of the House of Hohenzollern

The empire was a federation of 25 states that varied in size, demography, constitution, economy, religion and socio-political development. Even Prussia, with two-thirds of the population, had emerged from the empire's periphery as a newcomer, and faced cultural and economic internal divisions. Smaller territories rejected the Prussianized concept of the nation and preferred to associate such terms with their state. The Hanseatic ports advocated free trade, objected to Prussian economic integration and refused to sign the Zollverein (Custom Union) treaties until 1888.

The Prusso-German authorities were aware of integration issues as the results of the first imperial elections demonstrated. Historians argue that the nation-state was forged through empire. National identity was expressed in bombastic imperial stone iconography and was to be achieved as an imperial people, with an emperor as head of state and it was to develop imperial ambitions.

Bismarck's domestic policies were based on his effort to universally adopt the idea of the Protestant Prussian state, and achieve separation of church and state. In the Kulturkampf (culture struggle) from 1871 to 1878, he tried to minimize the influence of the Catholic Church and its political arm, the Catholic Centre Party, via secularization of education and introduction of civil marriage, but without success. The Kulturkampf antagonised many Protestants too, and was abandoned. The millions of non-German imperial subjects, such as the Polish, Danish and French minorities, had to endure discrimination or accept Germanisation.

Historians have cited the campaign against the Catholic church, as well as a similar campaign against the Social Democratic Party, as leaving a lasting influence on German consciousness, whereby national unity can be encouraged by persecuting a minority. This strategy, later referred to as "negative integration", set a tone of either being loyal to the government or an enemy of the state, which influenced German nationalist sentiment and the Nazi movement.

==== A three-class system ====
The Empire provided opportunities for the nobility, in the civil services and army. Aristocratic control guaranteed it decision making in universities and churches. The Prussian tradition to reserve military leadership for aristocrats was adopted, the constitution put military affairs under the Emperor, not the Reichstag. The military strengthened its role as "The estate which upheld the nation", and became a "self-perpetuating caste". Many of the nobility became industrialists.

The urban middle class grew exponentially, though it never acquired powerful parliamentary representation as in France or Britain. The rise of the Socialist Workers' Party aimed to establish a socialist order through the transformation of existing political and social conditions. From 1878, Bismarck opposed it by outlawing the party's organisation and its newspapers. Nonetheless, the movement grew and Bismarck initiated his social welfare program in 1883 to appease the working class. Bismarck built on welfare programs in Prussia and Saxony. In the 1880s he introduced pensions, accident insurance, medical care, and unemployment insurance that began the European welfare state. His programs won industry support because their goals were to reduce emigrants to America, where wages were higher but welfare did not exist. Bismarck further won support by high tariffs, which protected profits and wages from American competition, although they alienated liberals who wanted free trade.

==== Foreign policy ====
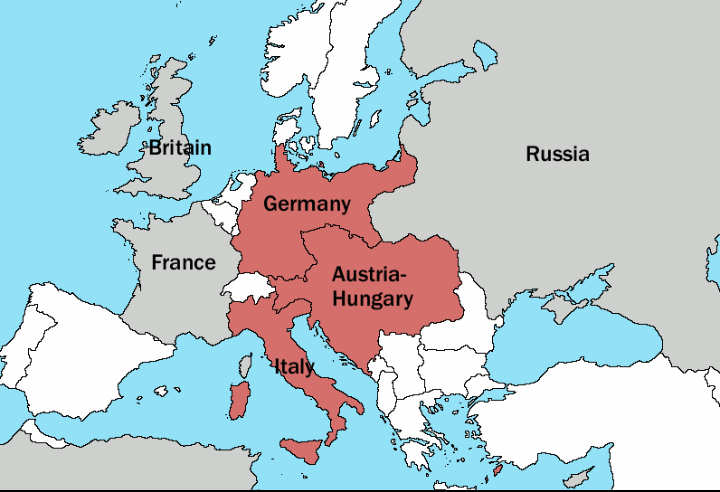
The Triple Alliance of Germany, Austria and Italy in 1913

Bismarck's foreign policy aimed at prevention of a Franco-Russian alliance, to avoid a Two-front war. The League of Three Emperors was signed in 1873 by Russia, Austria, and Germany. It stated that republicanism and socialism were common enemies and they would discuss matters concerning foreign policy. Bismarck needed good relations with Russia to keep France isolated.

Germany formed the Dual Alliance with Austria-Hungary in 1879, for mutual military assistance in the case of Russian attack. This led Russia to be conciliatory and in 1887, the Reinsurance Treaty was signed between Germany and Russia. They agreed on mutual military support if France attacked Germany or Austria attacked Russia. Russia turned towards Asia and remained inactive in European politics for 25 years. In 1882, Italy joined the Dual Alliance, which became the Triple Alliance. In return for German and Austrian support, Italy committed itself to assisting Germany in the case of French attack.

Bismarck had argued that acquisition of colonies was impractical and the burden of administration would outweigh the benefits. Eventually, Bismarck gave way, and colonies were established in Africa and Oceania. Bismarck initiated the Berlin Conference of 1885, for European colonial powers, who sought "established international guidelines for the acquisition of African territory". The General Act of the Berlin Conference, was the formalisation of the "Scramble for Africa" and "New Imperialism".

=== Wilhelminian Era (1888–1918) ===
==== Wilhelm II ====
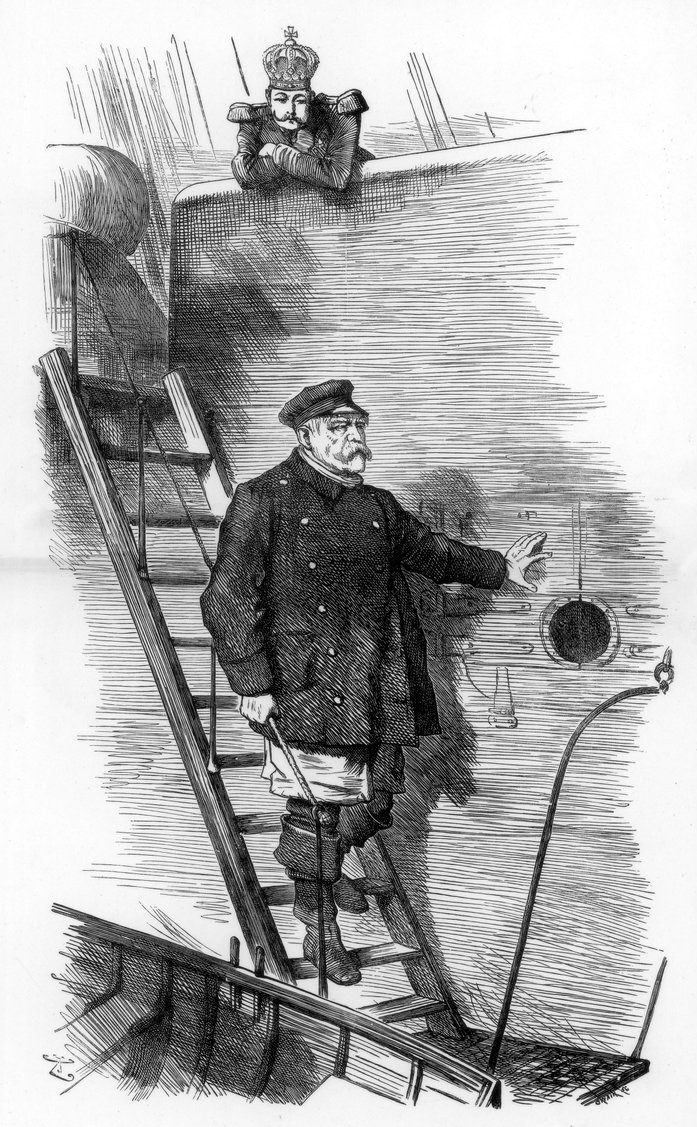
"Dropping the Pilot" – British cartoon depicting Bismarck's dismissal by Wilhelm II in 1890

Wilhelm I died in 1888. His son Frederick III died of cancer only three months after his coronation. His son Wilhelm II rejected the liberalism of his parents and embarked on autocratic rule. He replaced the political elite and in 1890 forced Bismarck to retire. Wilhelm was determined to exercise maximum influence on government.

==== Alliances and diplomacy ====
Wilhelm set out to apply his imperialist ideas of Weltpolitik ("world politics"), an aggressive course, to increase the empire's influence. Foreign policies were decided by him and foreign minister Friedrich von Holstein. Wilhelm refused to renew the Reinsurance Treaty with Russia, which led to the Franco-Russian Alliance of 1894. He refused to deviate from his imperial designs and began an Anglo-German naval arms race. Germany was left dependent on the Triple Alliance, with Austria-Hungary and Italy.

In 1897, Admiral Alfred von Tirpitz devised his plan to build a sizeable navy. Tirpitz theorized it would force Britain, dependent on unrestricted movement at sea, to compromise. Tirpitz started warship construction in 1898 and enjoyed Wilhelm's support. In exchange for the African island of Zanzibar, Germany had bargained the island of Heligoland in the German Bight with Britain in 1890, and converted it into a naval base. Britain considered Germany's imperial endeavours to infringe the delicate balance of global affairs and trade under British control. The British resolved to keep up the arms race and introduced the advanced Dreadnought battleship in 1906. Germany adopted it and by 1910 the arms race escalated.

==== Economy ====
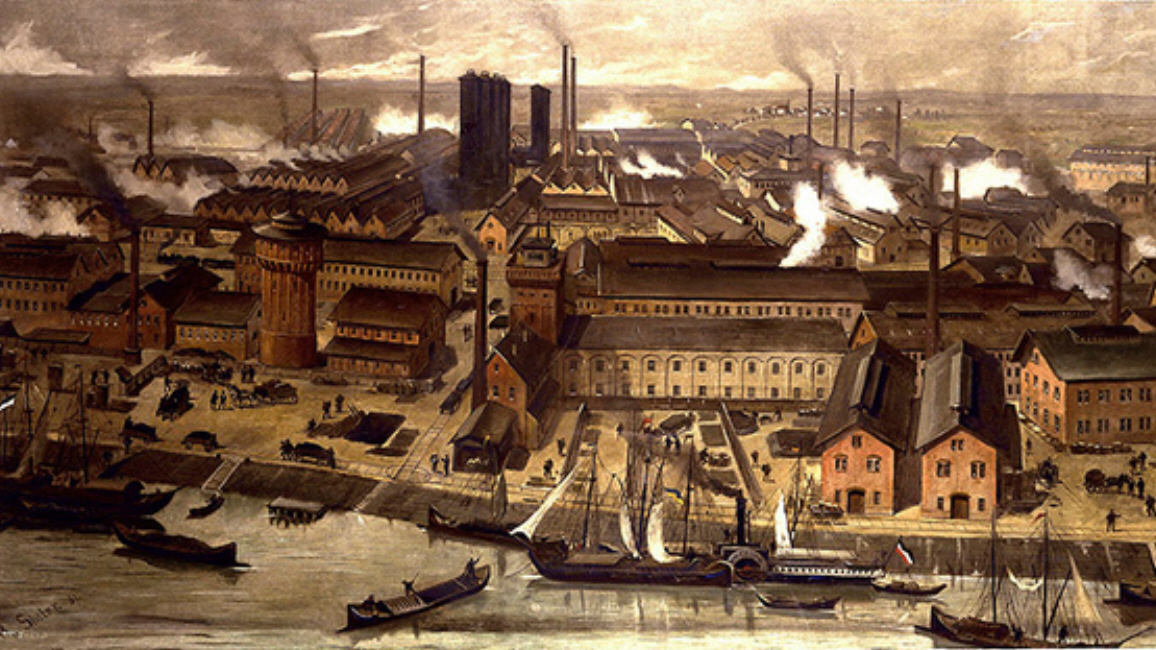
The BASF chemical factories in Ludwigshafen, 1881

By 1890, the economy continued to industrialize and grow at an even higher rate than the previous two decades, and increased dramatically in the years before World War I. Industrial production between 1870-1914 increased about 500%. Farmers abandoned traditional, inefficient practices in favour of artificial fertilizers and mechanical tools. Intensive farming of sugar and other root crops made Germany the most efficient agricultural producer in Europe by 1914.

The basics of chemical research and introduction of essential equipment such as Bunsen burners, Petri dishes, Erlenmeyer flasks, task-oriented working principles and team research originated in 19th-century Germany. The organisation of knowledge acquisition was refined by laboratory integration in research institutes. Germany acquired the leading role in the world's chemical industry by the late 19th century through organised methodology. In 1913, the German chemical industry produced 90 per cent of global dyestuffs and exported 80 per cent of its production.

Germany became Europe's leading steel-producing nation in the 1890s, thanks to protection from American and British competition afforded by tariffs and cartels. The merger of firms into the Vereinigte Stahlwerke (United Steel Works) in 1926 was modelled on U.S. Steel. The new company emphasized rationalization of management structures and modern technology. By 1913, American and German exports dominated the world steel market.

In machinery, iron, steel, and other industries, German firms avoided harmful competition and relied on trade associations. Germany was a world leader because of its "corporatist mentality", its bureaucratic tradition, and the encouragement of government. These associations regulated competition and allowed small firms to function in the shadow of larger companies.

==== Colonies ====
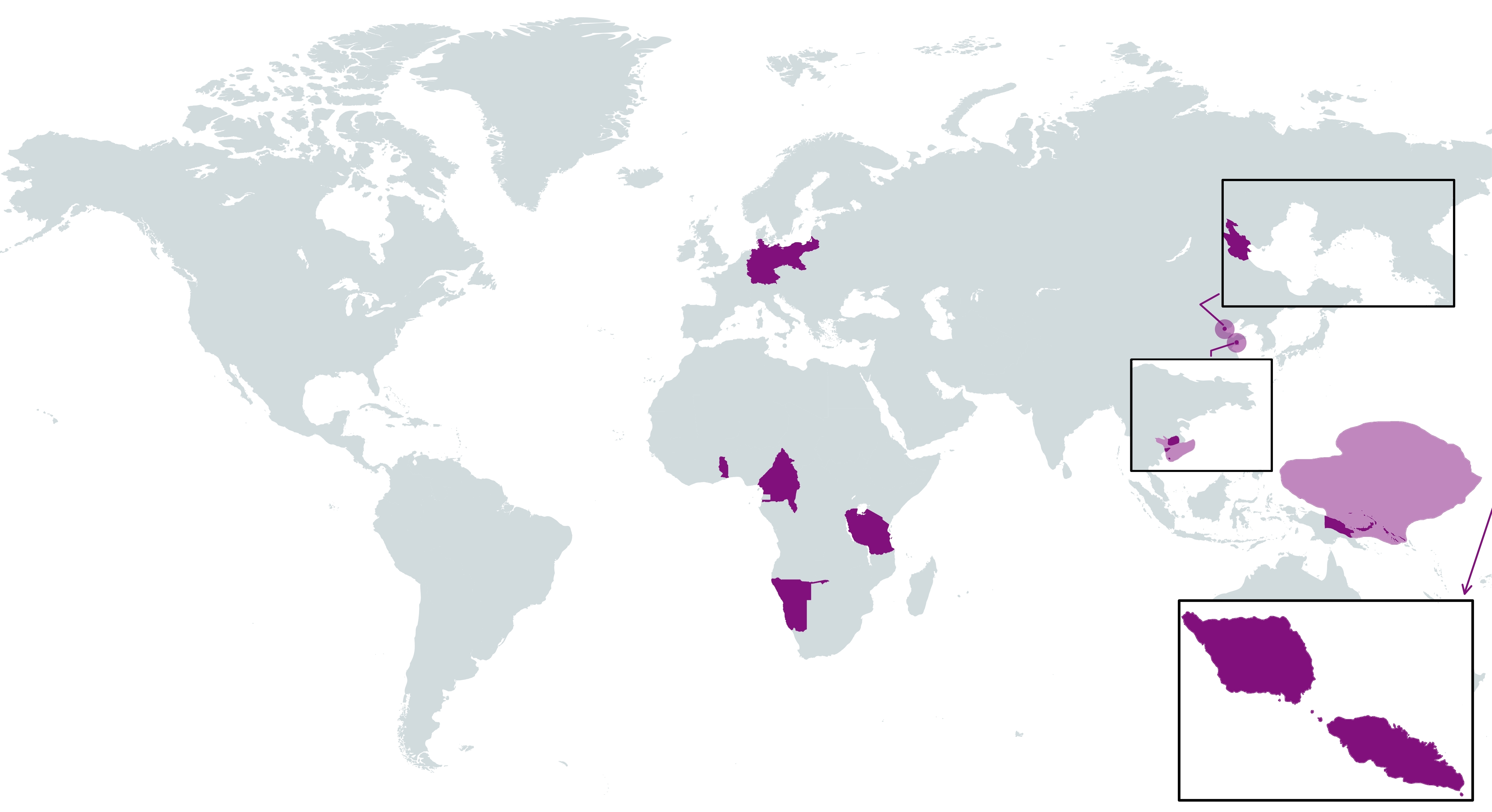
German colonies and protectorates in 1914

By the 1890s, German colonial expansion in Asia and the Pacific led to frictions with Britain, Russia, Japan and the US. The construction of the Baghdad Railway, financed by German banks, was designed to connect Germany with the Ottoman Empire and the Persian Gulf, but it collided with British and Russian geopolitical interests.

The largest colonial enterprises were in Africa. The harsh treatment of the Nama and Herero in Africa in 1904–08 led to charges of genocide. Historians debate the links between the Herero and Nama genocide and the Holocaust.

=== World War I ===
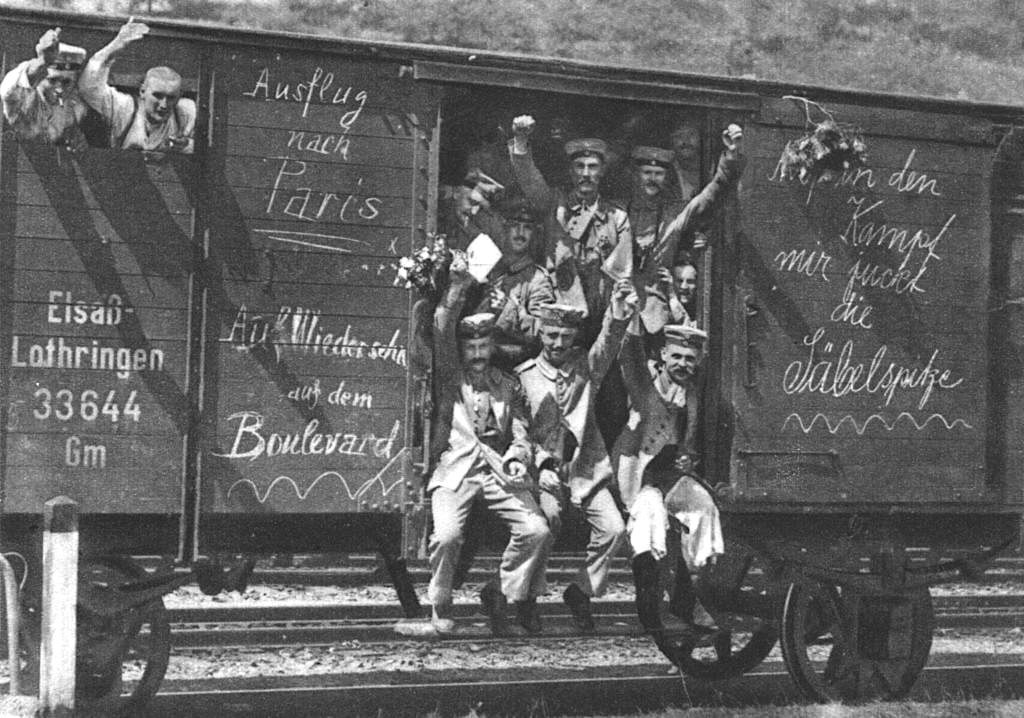
Soldiers on the way to the front in 1914. Expecting a short war, a message says "Trip to Paris".

Germany stood behind Austria in a confrontation with Serbia, but Serbia was under the protection of Russia, allied to France. Germany was the leader of the Central Powers, which included Austria-Hungary, the Ottoman Empire, and Bulgaria; against them were the Allies: Russia, France, Britain, and, in 1915, Italy.

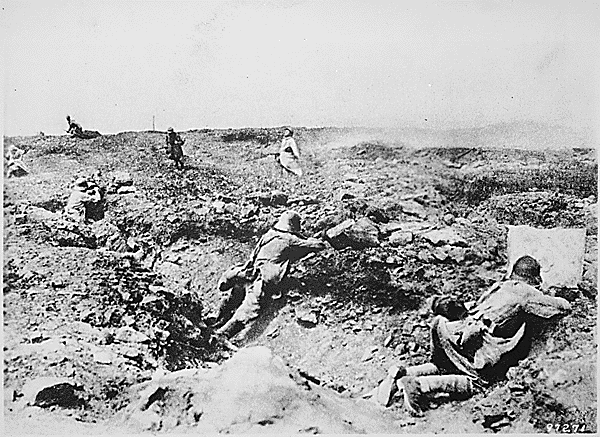
Entrenched German troops fighting off a French attack, Champagne, France, 1917

In the west, Germany sought quick victory by encircling Paris using the Schlieffen Plan. This failed due to Belgian and French resistance during the First Battle of the Marne. The Western Front became bloody trench warfare. The British imposed a naval blockade which lasted until 1919, reducing Germany's access to raw materials and food. Food scarcity became serious by 1917. In the east, Germany defeated Russian forces. This – exacerbated by the 1917 Russian Revolution – led to the Treaty of Brest-Litovsk, which the Bolsheviks were forced to sign in March 1918. It gave Germany control of Eastern Europe. When Germany complained that the 1919 Treaty of Versailles was too harsh, the Allies responded that it was more benign than Brest-Litovsk.

By defeating Russia in 1917, Germany was able to transfer hundreds of thousands of troops to the Western Front, giving it an advantage over the Allies. By retraining the soldiers in new storm-trooper tactics, the Germans hoped to win before the Americans could arrive in force. However, spring offensives failed, as the Allies regrouped, and the Germans lacked the reserves to consolidate gains. In the summer, with the Americans arriving at 10,000 a day, and Germany exhausted, the Allied offences destroyed the German army.

==== Homefront ====
Germany rapidly mobilized its civilian economy for the war effort. Conditions deteriorated, with food shortages in urban areas. Causes involved the transfer of farmers and food workers into the military, an overburdened railway, coal shortages, and the British blockade. Winter 1916–17 was the "turnip winter", because that vegetable was used as a substitute for increasingly scarce potatoes and meat. Soup kitchens were opened to feed people, and the army cut rations for soldiers. Morale sunk. The 1918 flu pandemic struck hard at a population weakened by malnutrition.

=== Revolution 1918–19 ===
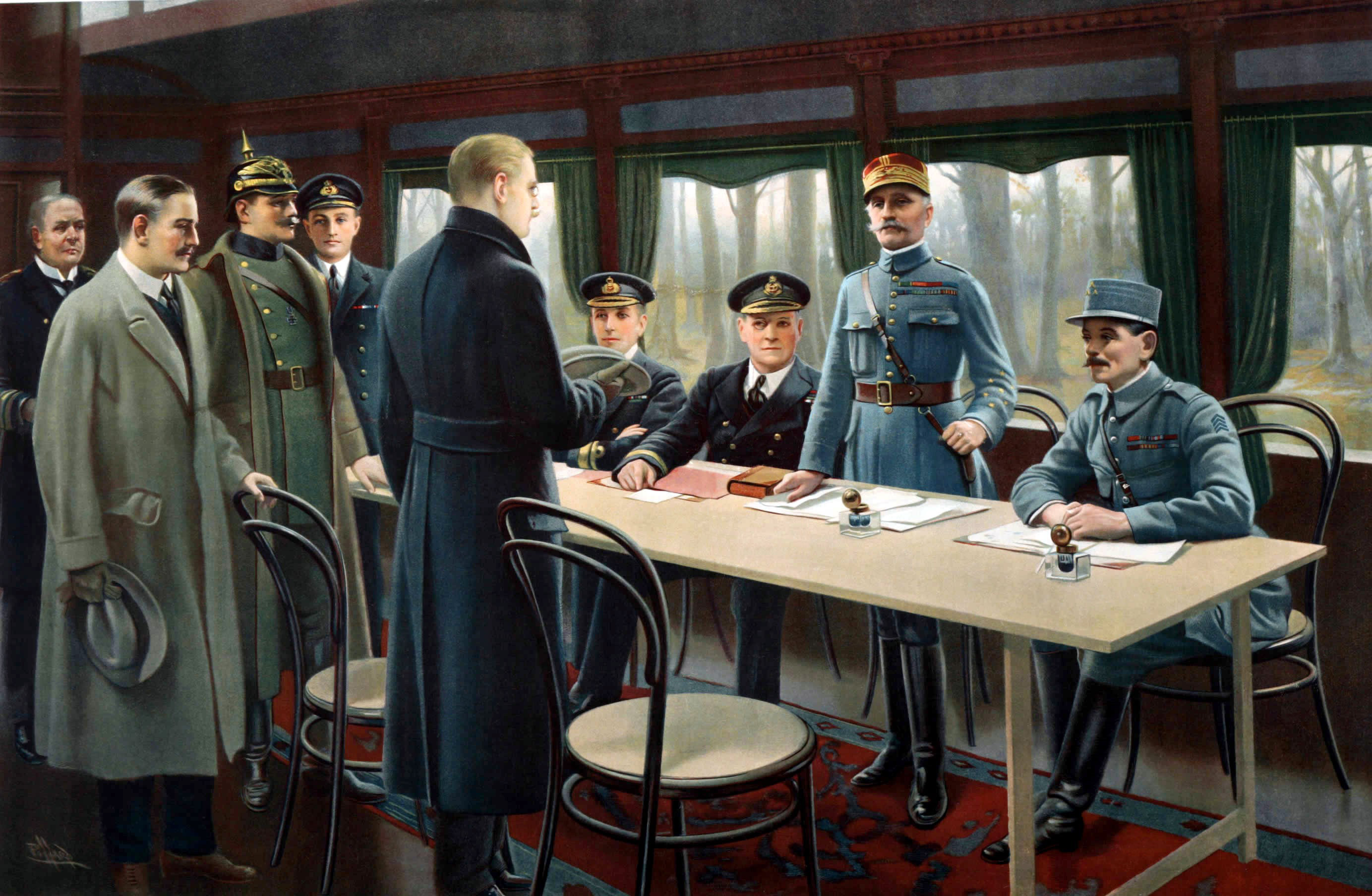
Painting depicting the Armistice with Germany in Compiègne, 11 November 1918

In October 1918, General Ludendorff, who wanted to protect the reputation of the army by placing responsibility for the capitulation on the democratic parties and Imperial Reichstag, pushed for the government to be democratised. A new chancellor was appointed, members of the Reichstag's majority parties were brought into the cabinet for the first time and the constitution reformed. This did not, however, satisfy either the Allies or most Germans.

The German revolution of 1918–1919 began on 3 November with a sailor's mutiny at Kiel which spread across Germany. Within a week, workers' and soldiers' councils were in control of government and military institutions. On 9 November, Germany was declared a republic. The Council of the People's Deputies, formed from the two main socialist parties, began acting as the provisional government. By the end of the month, all Germany's monarchs, including Emperor Wilhelm II, who had fled to the Netherlands, had been forced to abdicate.

In January 1919, the Spartacist uprising led by the newly founded Communist Party of Germany attempted to take power in Berlin, but it was quashed by government and Freikorps troops. Into the spring there were violently suppressed efforts to push the revolution further in the direction of a council republic, such as the local soviet republics, notably in Bavaria (Munich). They too were put down with considerable loss of life.

The revolution ended in August 1919. The Weimar Constitution was signed following its adoption by the popularly elected Weimar National Assembly. Though the violence largely ended, the revolution remained incomplete. Many of its opponents had been left in power in the military and Reich administration, and it failed to resolve the fracture in the Left between moderate socialists and communists. The Weimar Republic as a result was beset by opponents from the Left and – to a greater degree – the Right.

== Weimar Republic, 1918–33 ==
=== Treaty of Versailles ===
Germany 1920–38

The Armistice of 11 November 1918 ended the fighting in World War I, and in 1919 Germany reluctantly signed the Treaty of Versailles. Germany had to renounce sovereignty over its colonies and in Europe lost 65,000 km^{2} (25,000 sq mi), about 13% of its territory – including 48% of its iron resources – along with 7 million people, 12% of its population. Allied troops occupied the Rhineland, and it, along with an area stretching 50 kilometres east of the Rhine, were demilitarized. The German army was limited to no more than 100,000 men and no general staff; the navy could have 15,000 men. Germany was prohibited from having an air force, submarines or dreadnoughts. Many of its ships were to be surrendered. The most contentious treaty article, the so-called War Guilt Clause, stated that Germany accepted responsibility for the damage caused to the Allies, and had to pay reparations. The treaty was reviled as a dictated rather than a negotiated peace.

=== The early years ===
Flag of the Weimar Republic 1919–1933

The Weimar Constitution established a federal semi-presidential republic with a chancellor dependent on the confidence of the Reichstag (parliament), a strong president who had considerable powers to govern by decree, and a set of individual rights. The Social Democrat Friedrich Ebert was the Republic's first president.

The Left accused the Social Democrats of betraying the labour movement, because of their alliance with the old elites in the military and administration, and the Right held the supporters of the Republic responsible for Germany's defeat. In early 1920, the right-wing Kapp Putsch briefly took control of the government in Berlin, but the putsch collapsed due to a general strike and passive resistance by civil servants. In the putsch's wake, workers in the industrial Ruhr area, where dissatisfaction with the lack of nationalisation of key industries was high, rose up and attempted to take control of the region. Reichswehr and Freikorps units suppressed the Ruhr uprising with more than 1,200 people killed. The unstable political conditions were reflected in the 1920 German federal election, in which the centre-left Weimar Coalition, which had held a three-quarters majority, lost 125 seats to parties on the Left and Right. A right-wing extremist group assassinated former minister Matthias Erzberger in 1921 and Walther Rathenau, the Jewish foreign minister, in 1922. 1923 saw the communist-led takeover attempt German October, the right-wing Küstrin Putsch and Adolf Hitler's Beer Hall Putsch.

Germany was the first state to establish diplomatic relations with the new Soviet Union in the Treaty of Rapallo (1922). In 1925, Germany, France, Belgium, Britain and Italy signed the Treaty of Locarno, which recognised Germany's borders with France and Belgium, but left its eastern borders open to negotiations. The treaty paved the way for Germany's admission to the League of Nations in 1926.

In 1921 the Allies set Germany's reparations liability at 132 billion gold marks, to be paid in gold or commodities such as iron, steel and coal. After German defaults, French and Belgian troops occupied the Ruhr in 1923. The German government responded with passive resistance. It underwrote the costs of idled factories and mines, and paid the workers on strike. Unable to meet the costs it resorted to printing money. This was a major cause of the 1923 German hyperinflation. The passive resistance was called off in September 1923, and the occupation ended in August 1925, following the Dawes Plan to restructure reparations. In November 1923 the government introduced a new currency, the Rentenmark (later the Reichsmark). Together with other measures, it stopped hyperinflation, but many Germans who lost their savings became bitter enemies of the Weimar Republic and supporters of the anti-democratic Right. During the following six years the economy improved. In 1928 Germany's industrial production surpassed that of 1913.

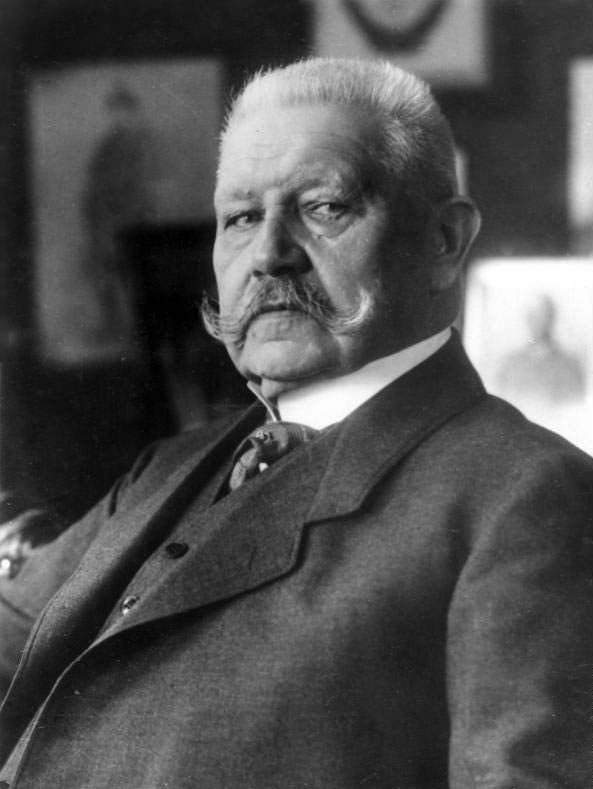
Paul von Hindenburg, German president 1925–1934

In 1925, following the death of President Ebert, conservative Field Marshal Paul von Hindenburg was elected. His presidency, coming after a campaign that emphasised nationalism and Hindenburg's ties to the empire, was a significant shift to the right.

=== Economic collapse and end of the Republic, 1929–33 ===
The Wall Street crash of 1929 marked the beginning of the worldwide Great Depression, which hit Germany hard. In 1931 several major banks failed, and by early 1932 unemployment had soared to six million. In the Reichstag election of September 1930, the Communist Party of Germany (KPD) gained 23 seats, while the National Socialist German Workers' Party (NSDAP, Nazi Party), increased its share by 95 seats, becoming Germany's second largest party behind the Social Democrats. The Nazis were particularly successful among Protestants, the unemployed, lower middle classes in the cities and the rural population. It was weakest in large cities. The shift to the political extremes made the unstable coalition system unworkable. The last years of Weimar were marred by even more political instability and violence. Four chancellors (Heinrich Brüning, Franz von Papen, Kurt von Schleicher and, from 30 January to 23 March 1933, Adolf Hitler) governed through presidential decree rather than parliamentary consultation. It effectively rendered the Reichstag powerless as a means of enforcing constitutional checks and balances.

Hindenburg was re-elected president in 1932, out-polling Hitler by 6 million votes. The Nazis became the largest party following the election of July 1932. It received 37% of the vote, with the SPD second at 22%, and the communists third at 14%. The Nazis dropped to 33% after another election four months later, but remained the largest party. The splintered Reichstag was still unable to form a stable coalition. On 30 January 1933, seeing no other viable option and pressured by former chancellor Franz von Papen and other conservatives, Hindenburg appointed Hitler chancellor.

=== Science and culture in 19th and 20th century ===
The Weimar years saw a flowering of German science and culture, before the Nazi regime resulted in many renowned scientists and writers deciding to leave. German recipients dominated the Nobel prizes in science, particularly physics before 1933, led by Wilhelm Conrad Röntgen, Albert Einstein, Otto Hahn, Max Planck and Werner Heisenberg. Chemistry was dominated by German researchers at major chemical companies such as BASF and Bayer, and with people such as Justus von Liebig, Fritz Haber and Emil Fischer. Georg Cantor in the 19th century and David Hilbert in the 20th century, made major advances in mathematics. Karl Benz, the inventor of the automobile, and Rudolf Diesel were pivotal figures in engineering, along with Wernher von Braun, rocket engineer. Ferdinand Cohn, Robert Koch and Rudolf Virchow were key figures in microbiology.

Among the most important German writers were Thomas Mann, Hermann Hesse and Bertolt Brecht. The reactionary historian Oswald Spengler wrote The Decline of the West (1918–23) and influenced intellectuals in Germany such as Martin Heidegger, Max Scheler, and the Frankfurt School, as well as intellectuals around the world.

After 1933, Nazi proponents of "Aryan physics", led by the Nobel Prize-winners Johannes Stark and Philipp Lenard, attacked Einstein's theory of relativity as a degenerate example of Jewish materialism. Many scientists and humanists emigrated; Einstein moved permanently to the U.S. but others returned after 1945.

19th and 20th century German authors, scientists and philosophers
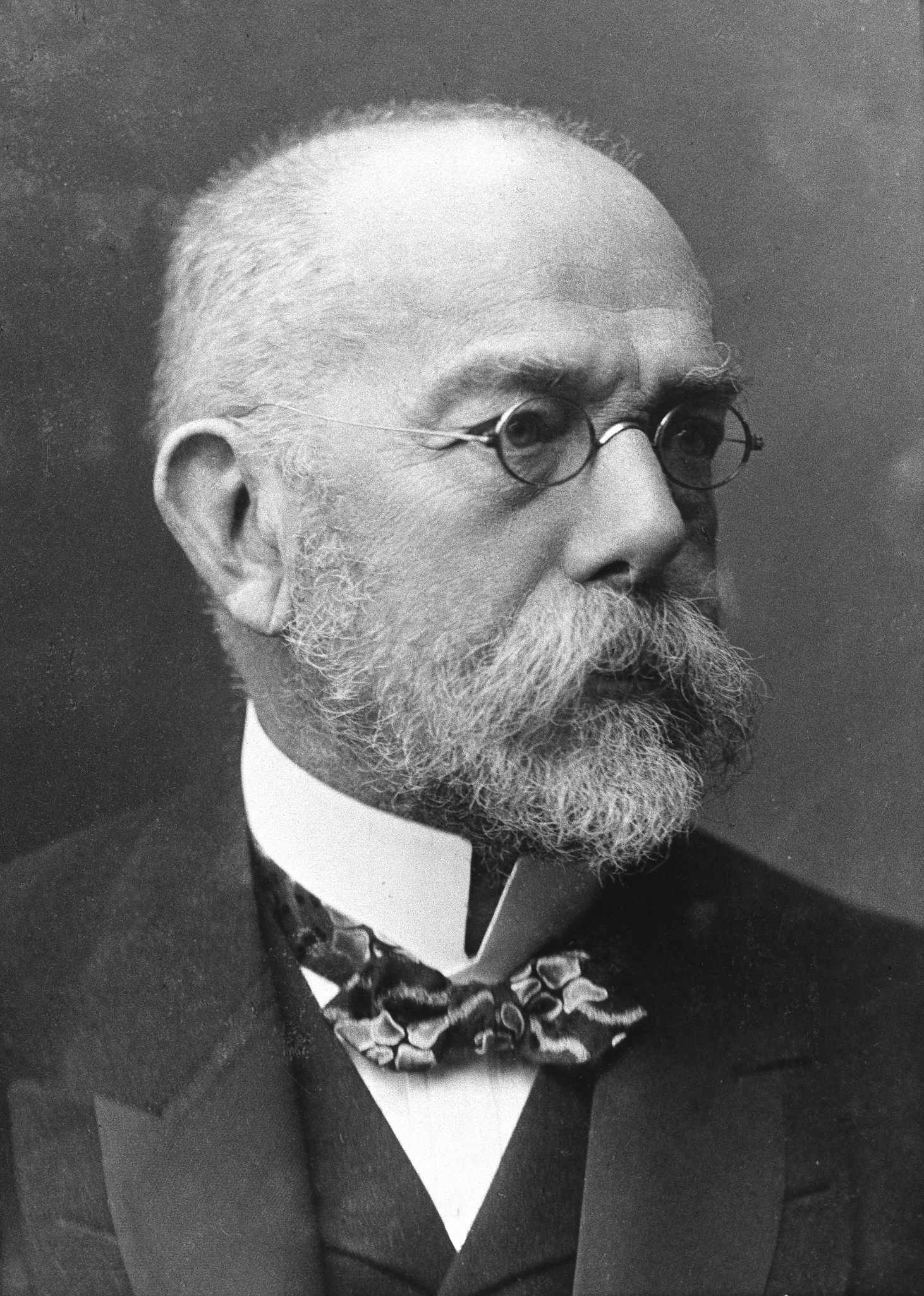
Robert Koch

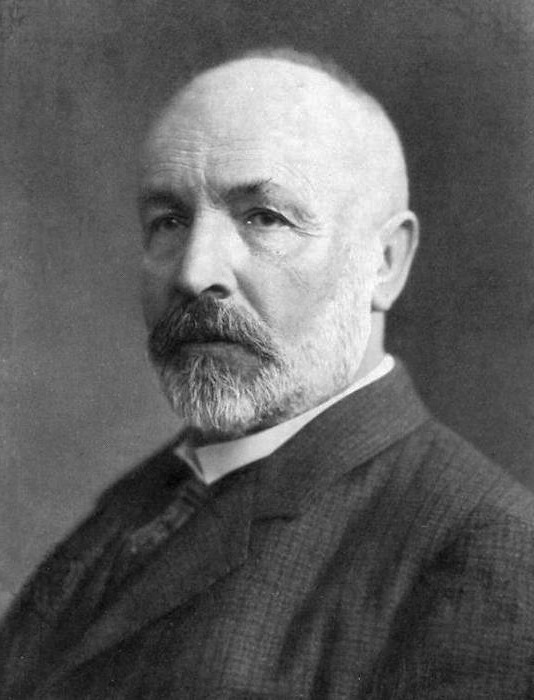
Georg Cantor

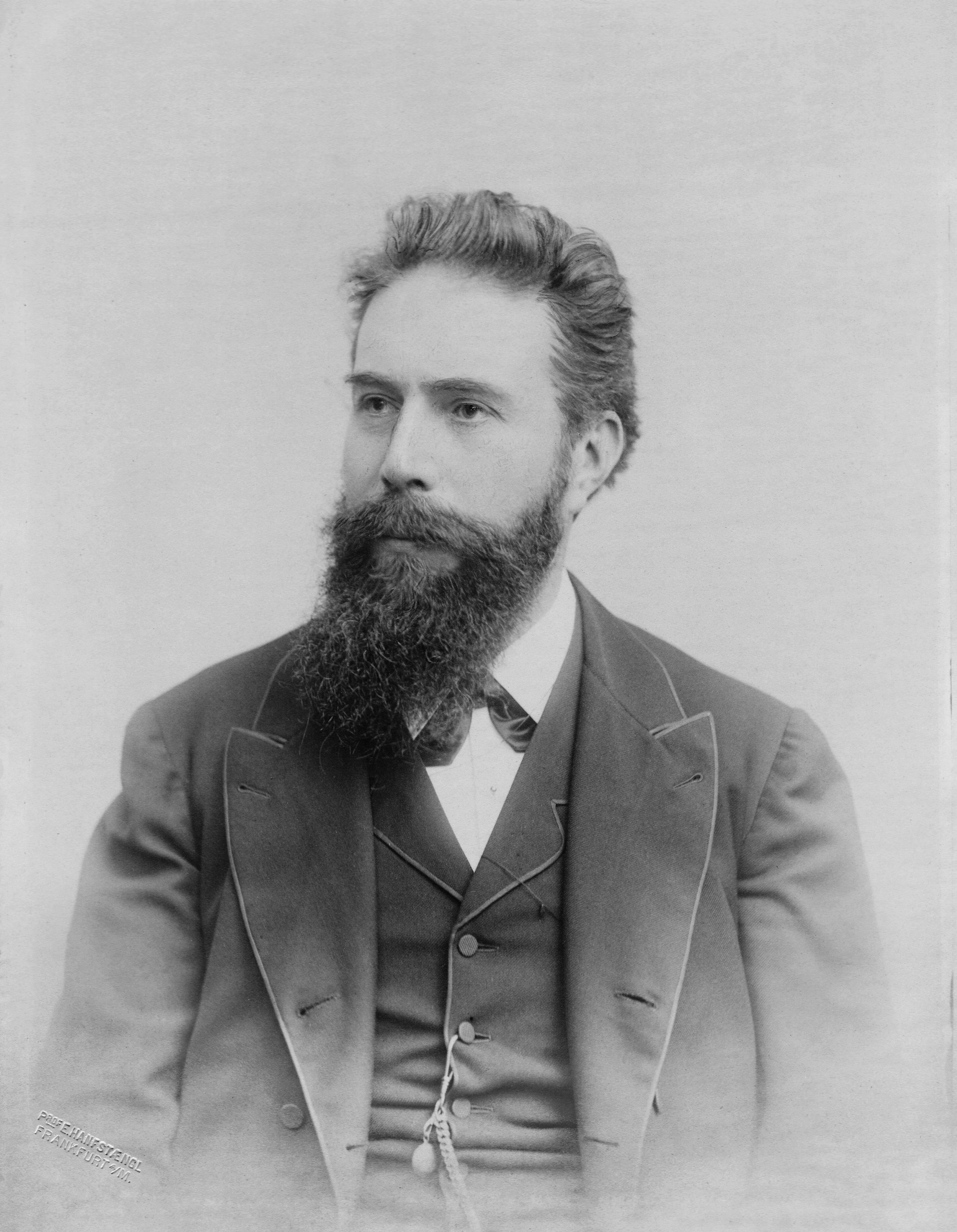
Wilhelm Röntgen

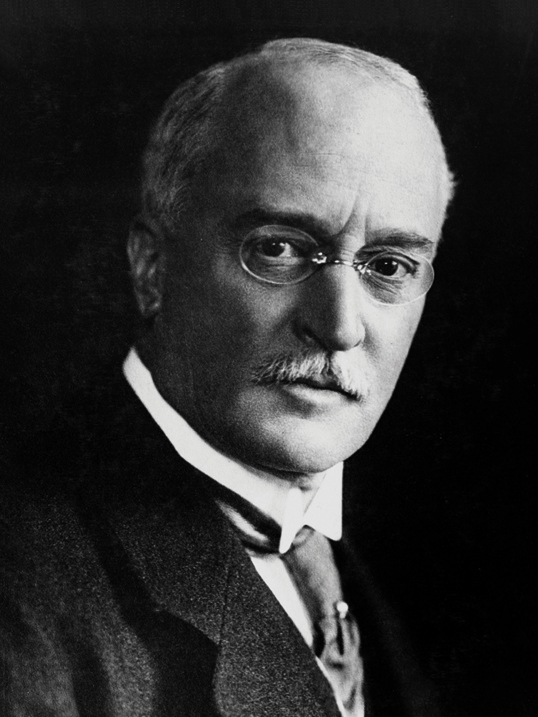
Rudolf Diesel

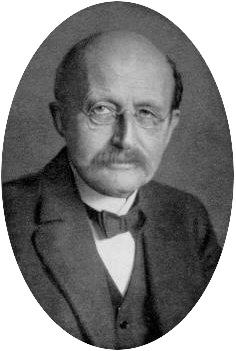
Max Planck

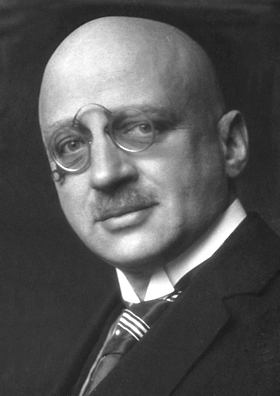
Fritz Haber

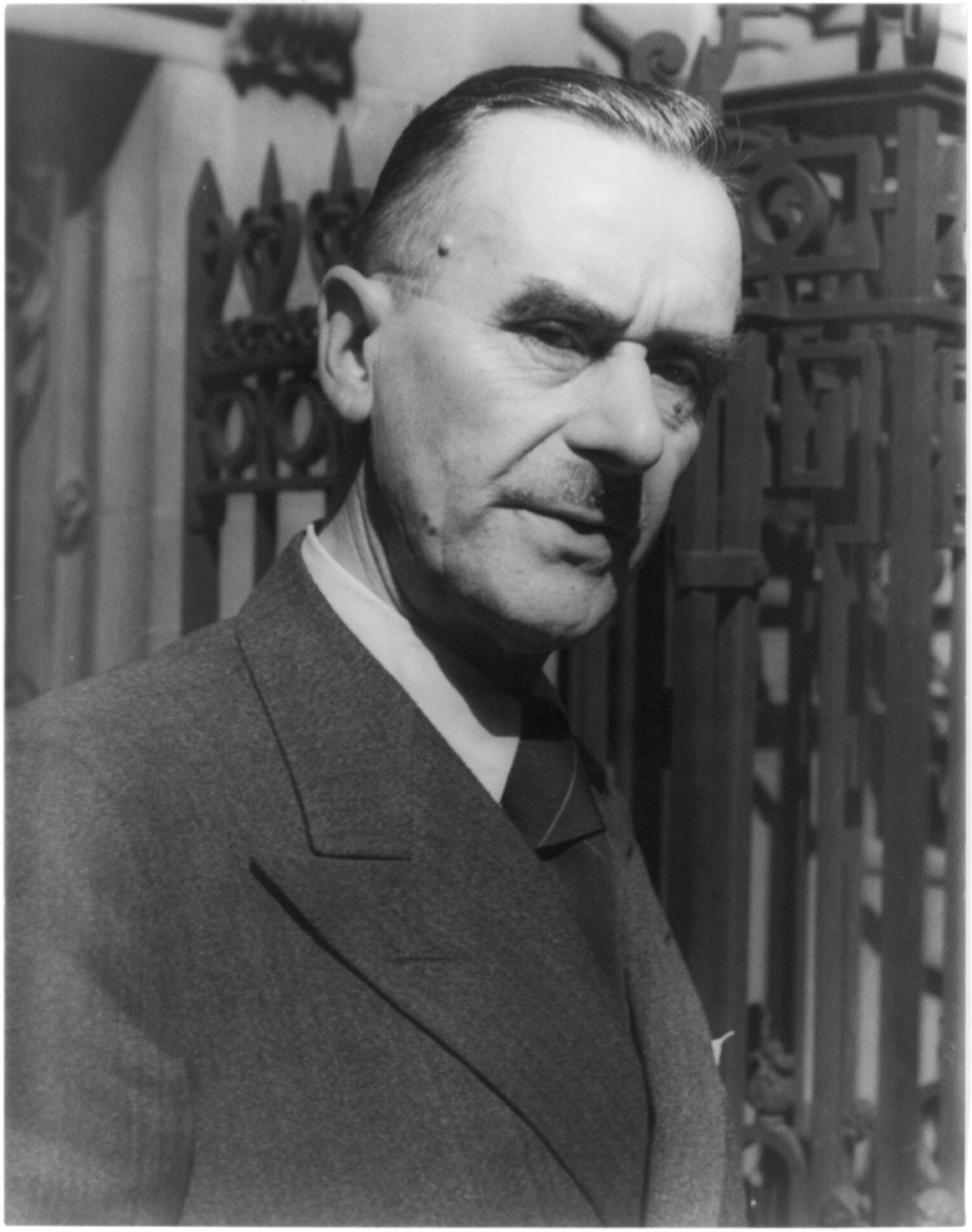
Thomas Mann

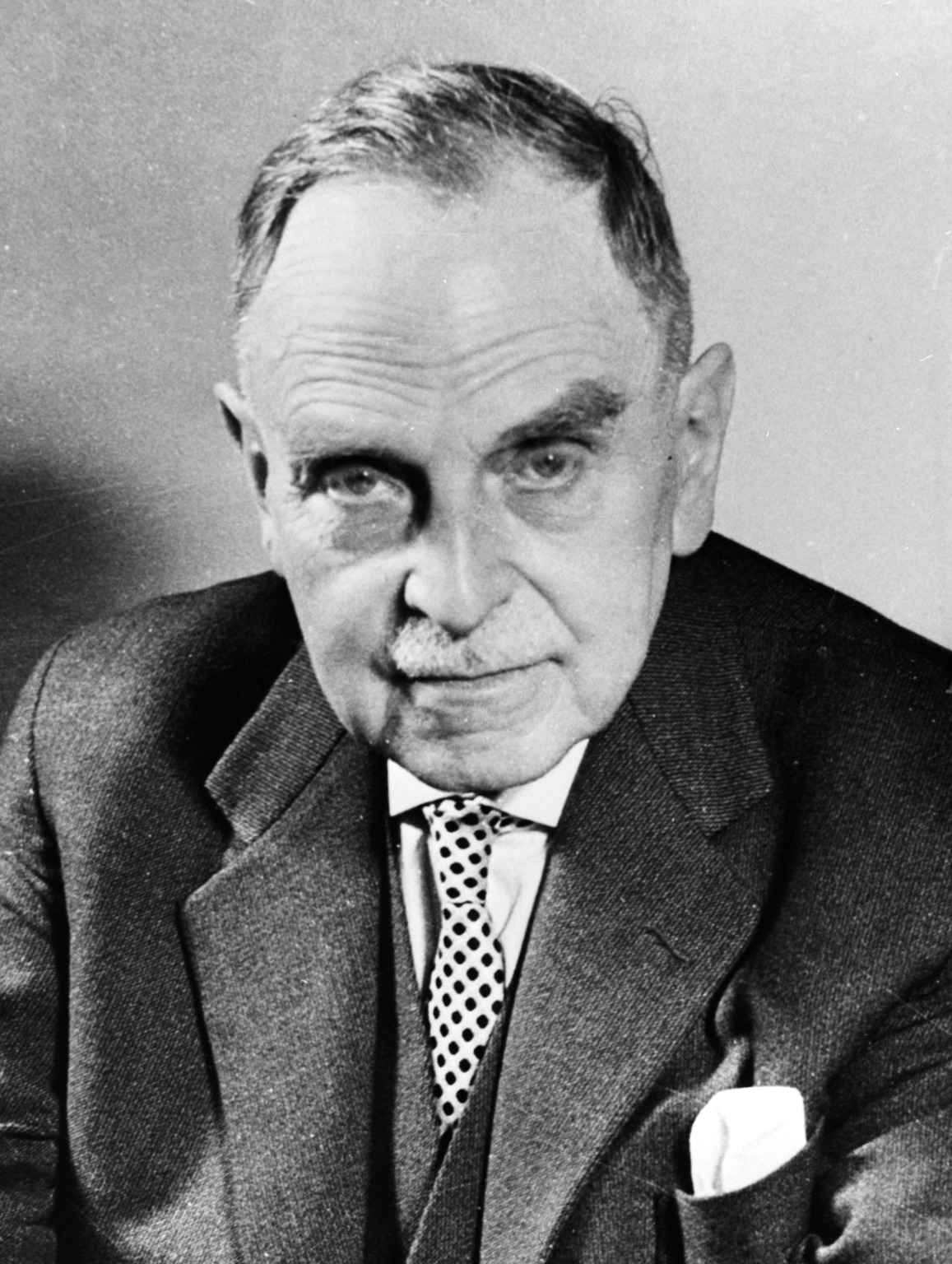
Otto Hahn

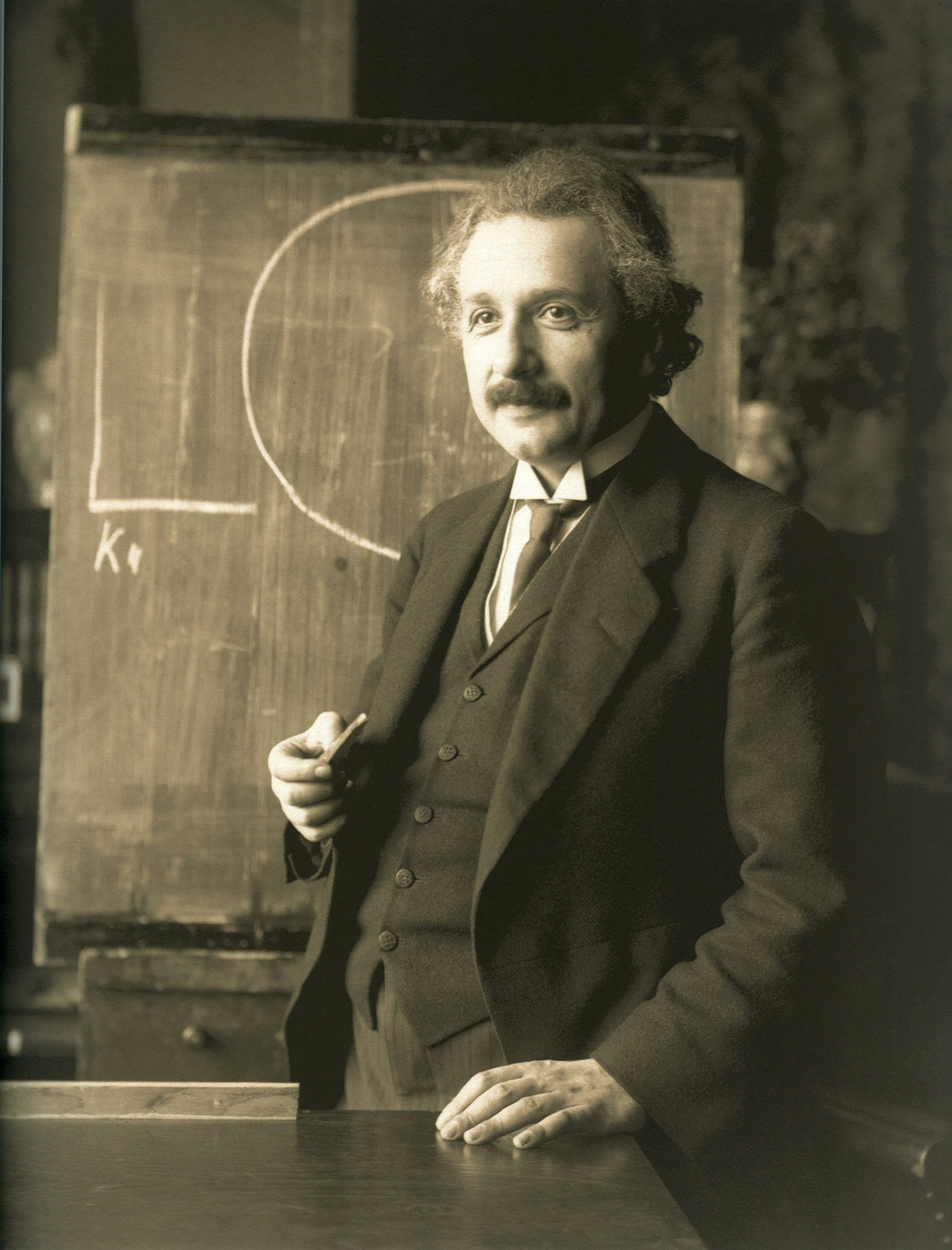
Albert Einstein

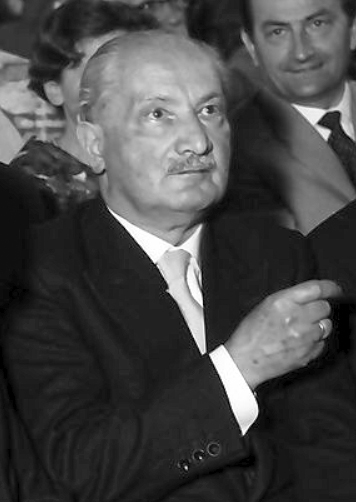
Martin Heidegger

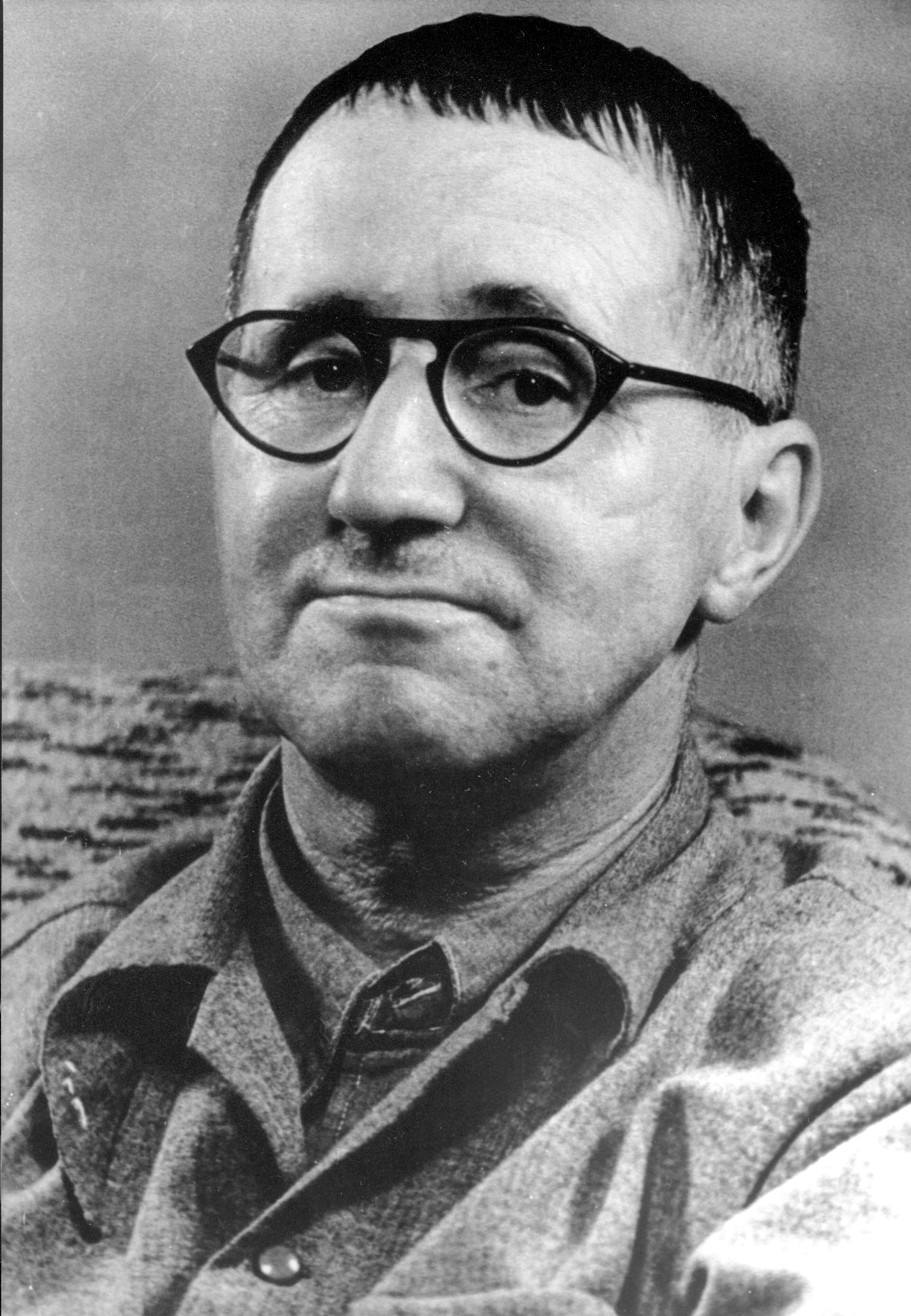
Bertolt Brecht

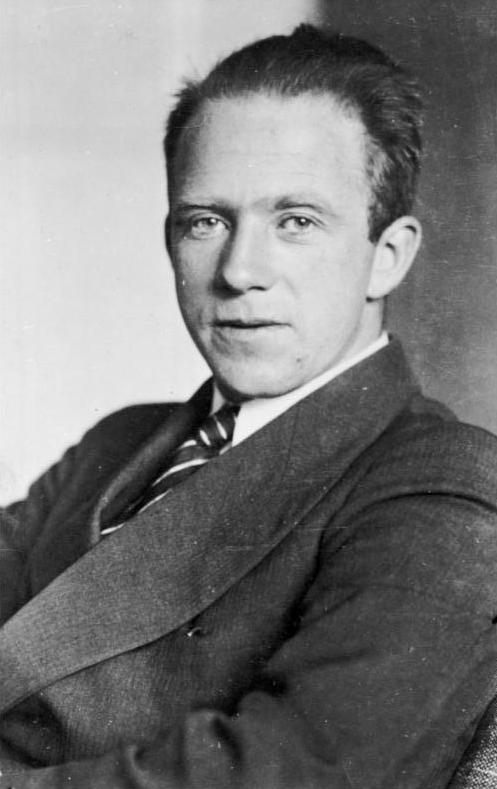
Werner Heisenberg

== Nazi Germany, 1933–1945 ==
National flag of Germany, 1935–45

The Nazi regime suppressed labour unions and strikes, leading to short-term growth which gave the Nazi Party popularity, with only limited German resistance to their rule. The Gestapo (secret police) destroyed political opposition and persecuted the Jews, trying to force them into exile. The Party took control of the courts, local government, and all civic organisations except the Christian churches. Expressions of public opinion were controlled by the propaganda ministry, which used film, mass rallies, and Hitler's speeches. The Nazi state idolized Hitler as its Führer (leader), putting all power in his hands. Nazi propaganda centered on Hitler and created the "Hitler Myth"—that Hitler was all-wise, and mistakes by others would be corrected when brought to his attention. In fact Hitler had a narrow range of interests and decision making was diffused among overlapping, feuding power centres; on some issues he was passive, simply assenting to senior Nazi advisers. All senior officials reported to Hitler and followed his overall direction, but had considerable autonomy on a daily basis.

=== Establishment of the Nazi regime ===
To secure a Reichstag majority, Hitler called for new elections. After the 27 February 1933 Reichstag fire, Hitler blamed an alleged Communist uprising, and convinced President Hindenburg to approve the Reichstag Fire Decree, rescinding civil liberties. Four thousand communists were arrested and Communist agitation was banned. Communists and Socialists were brought into Nazi concentration camps, where they were at the mercy of the Gestapo. Communist Reichstag deputies were taken into "protective custody".

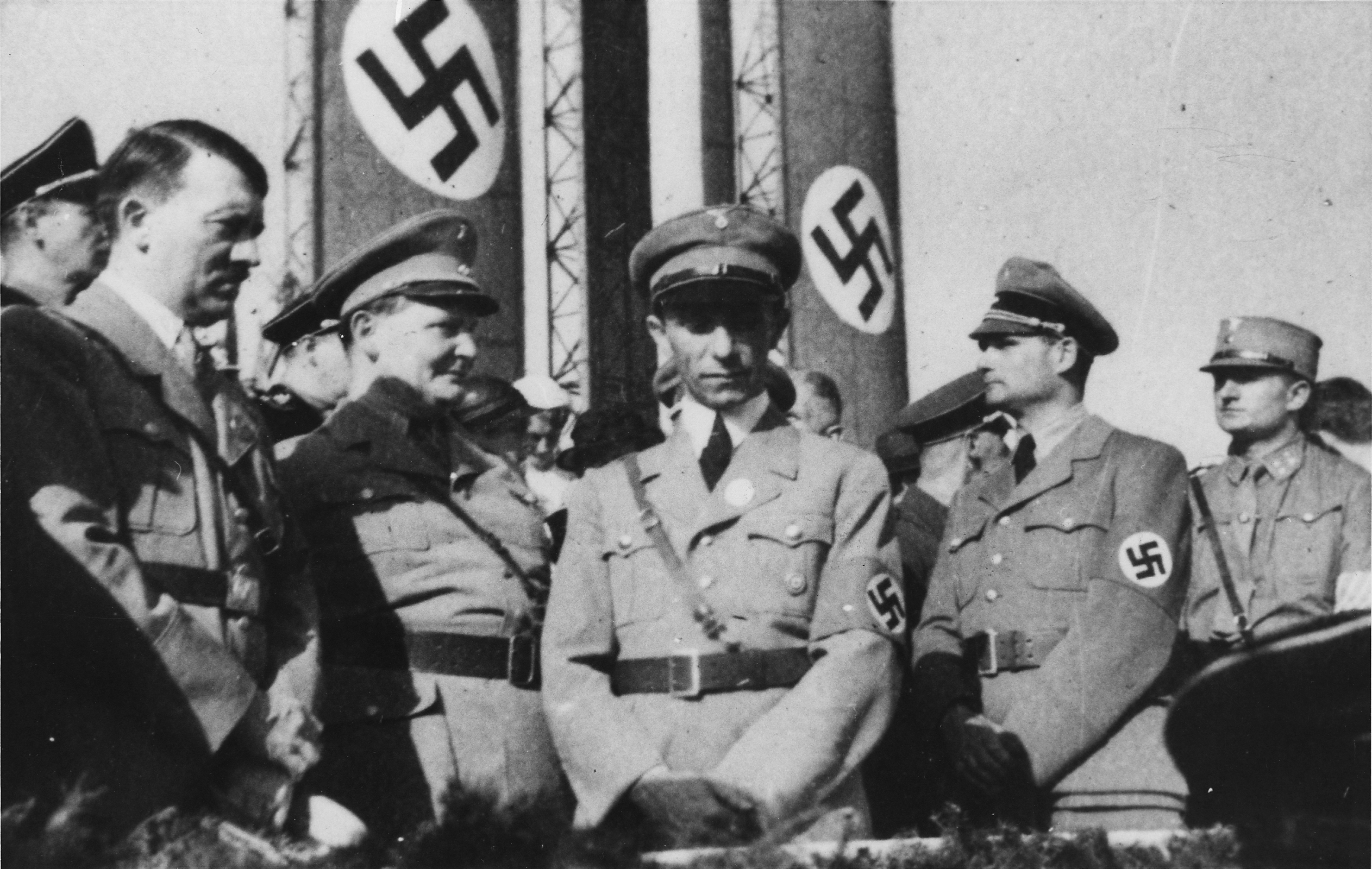
Leaders of the Nazi regime in 1933 (left to right): Adolf Hitler, Hermann Göring, Joseph Goebbels and Rudolf Hess

Despite the terror and unprecedented propaganda, the last free elections of 5 March 1933, while resulting in a 44% share of the vote, failed to give the Nazis a majority. Together with the German National People's Party (DNVP), however, he was able to form a majority government. On 23 March 1933, the Enabling Act, allowed Hitler and his cabinet to enact laws without the President or Reichstag. The Act formed the basis for the dictatorship and dissolution of the Länder. Trade unions and parties, other than the Nazi Party, were suppressed. A totalitarian state was established, no longer based on the liberal Weimar constitution. Germany withdrew from the League of Nations. The parliament was rigged by defining the absence of arrested and murdered deputies as voluntary and therefore cause for their exclusion as wilful absentees. The Centre Party was voluntarily dissolved in a quid pro quo with the anti-communist Pope Pius XI for the Reichskonkordat; and by these manoeuvres Hitler achieved movement of Catholic voters into the Nazi Party, and more international acceptance of his regime. The Communist Party was proscribed in April 1933.

Hitler used the SS and Gestapo to purge the entire SA leadership—along with several of Hitler's political adversaries in the Night of the Long Knives from 30 June to 2 July 1934. As a reward, the SS became an independent organisation under the command of the Reichsführer-SS Heinrich Himmler. Upon Hindenburg's death on 2 August, Hitler's cabinet passed a law proclaiming the presidency vacant and transferred its role and powers to Hitler.

=== Antisemitism and the Holocaust ===
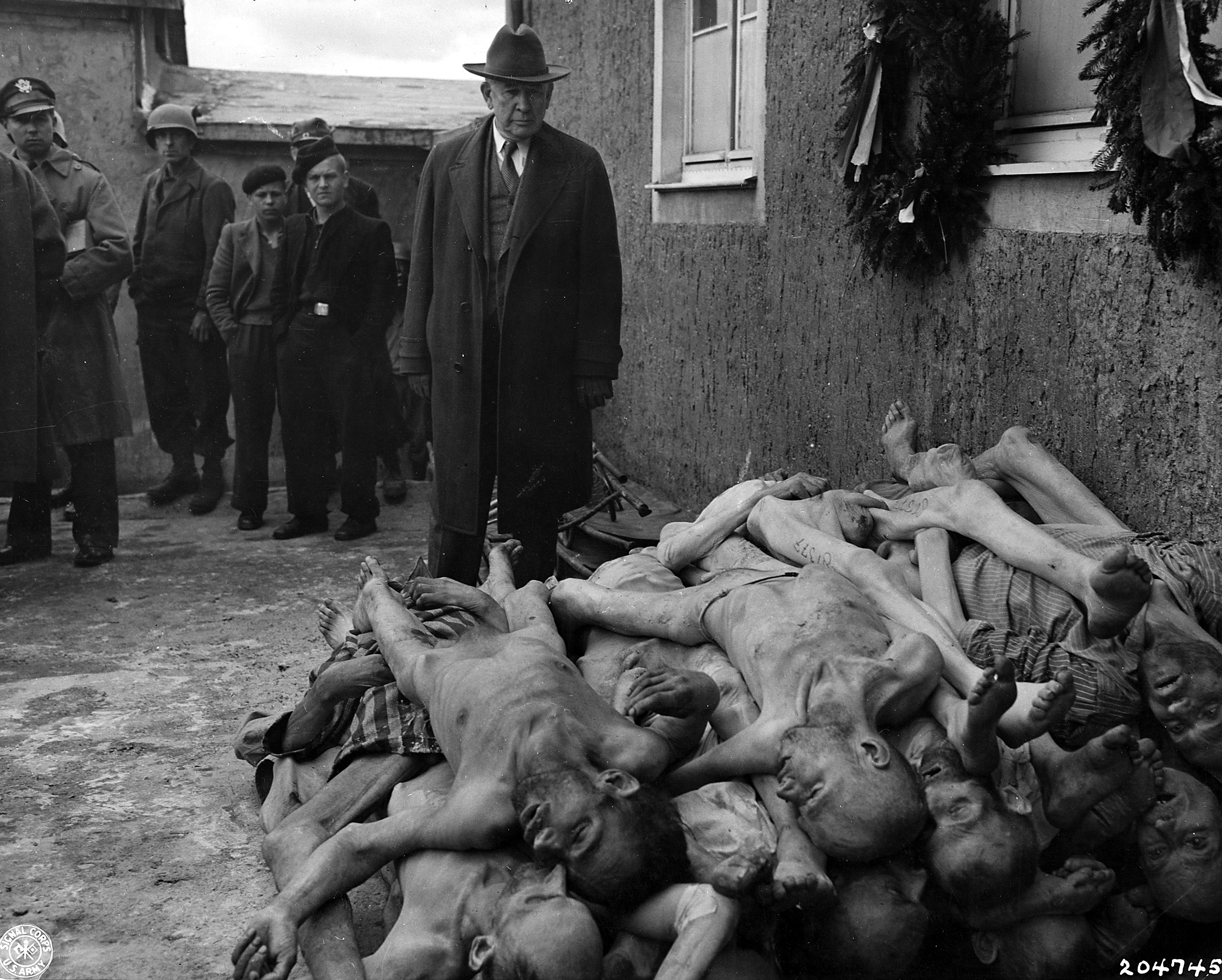
U.S. Senator Alben W. Barkley views the bodies of prisoners at a liberated Buchenwald concentration camp in April 1945.

The Nazi regime was particularly hostile towards Jews, who became the target of antisemitic propaganda attacks. The Nazis attempted to convince the Germans to treat Jews as "subhumans" and after the 1933 federal elections the Nazis imposed a nationwide boycott of Jewish businesses. In March 1933 the first Nazi concentration camp was established at Dachau. The Law for the Restoration of the Professional Civil Service forced Jews to retire from the legal profession and civil service. The Nuremberg Laws banned sexual relations between Jews and Germans and only those of German or related blood were eligible to be considered citizens; the remainder were classed as state subjects, without citizenship rights. Jews continued to suffer persecution, exemplified by the Kristallnacht pogrom of 1938, and about half of Germany's 500,000 Jews fled before 1939, after which escape became almost impossible.

In 1941, the Nazi leadership decided to implement a plan that they called the "Final Solution" which is known as The Holocaust. Jews were systematically murdered at murder sites, and starting in 1942, at extermination camps. Around six million Jews were killed. Between 250,000-500,000 Romani and Sinti were killed by Nazi Germans and their collaborators.

=== Nazi eugenics ===
The social policies of eugenics in Nazi Germany were composed of various ideas about genetics. The Nazi racial theories placed the biological improvement of the Germans by selective breeding of "Nordic" or "Aryan" traits at its centre. These policies were used to justify the compulsory sterilization and mass murder of those deemed "undesirable". Those targeted were largely people living in private and state-operated institutions, identified as "life unworthy of life". They included people with congenital cognitive and physical disabilities (Erbkranken) – people who were considered feeble-minded. More than 400,000 people were sterilized against their will, while up to 300,000 were murdered under the Aktion T4 euthanasia program.

=== Military ===
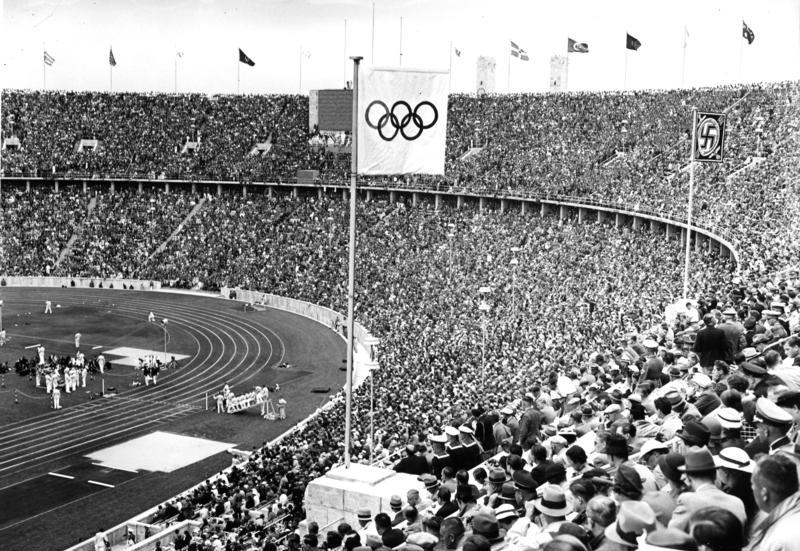
The 1936 Summer Olympics in Berlin – a great propaganda success for the Nazi regime

In 1935, Hitler officially re-established the Luftwaffe (airforce) and reintroduced universal military service, in breach of the Treaty of Versailles. Britain, France and Italy formally protested. Hitler had the officers swear personal allegiance to him. In 1936, German troops marched into the demilitarised Rhineland. As the territory was German, Britain and France did not believe attempting to enforce the treaty was worth the risk of war. The move strengthened Hitler's standing in Germany. His reputation swelled further with the 1936 Summer Olympics in Berlin, and proved another propaganda success for the regime as orchestrated by master propagandist Joseph Goebbels.

=== Foreign policy ===
Hitler's diplomatic strategy in the 1930s was to make seemingly reasonable demands, threatening war if they were not met. When opponents tried to appease him, he accepted the gains offered, then went on to the next target. That strategy worked as Germany pulled out of the League of Nations, rejected the Treaty of Versailles, began rearmament, won back the Saar, remilitarized the Rhineland, formed an alliance with Mussolini's Italy, sent military aid to Francisco Franco in the Spanish Civil War, annexed Austria, took over Czechoslovakia after the British and French appeasement of the Munich Agreement, formed a peace pact with Stalin's Soviet Union, and invaded Poland. Britain and France declared war on Germany and World War II in Europe began.

=== World War II ===
European territory occupied by Nazi Germany and its allies at its greatest extent in 1942

In April–June 1940, Germany conquered Denmark, Norway, the Low Countries, and France. The unexpectedly swift defeat of France resulted in an upswing in Hitler's popularity and war fever. Hitler made peace overtures to the British leader Winston Churchill in July 1940, but Churchill remained defiant with help from US president Franklin D. Roosevelt. Hitler's bombing campaign against Britain failed. 43,000 British civilians were killed in the Blitz, and much of London was destroyed. Germany's armed forces invaded the Soviet Union in June 1941, and swept forward until they reached Moscow. The Einsatzgruppen (Nazi mobile death squads) executed Soviet Jews, while the Germans went to Jewish households and forced families into concentration camps for labour, or to extermination camps for death.

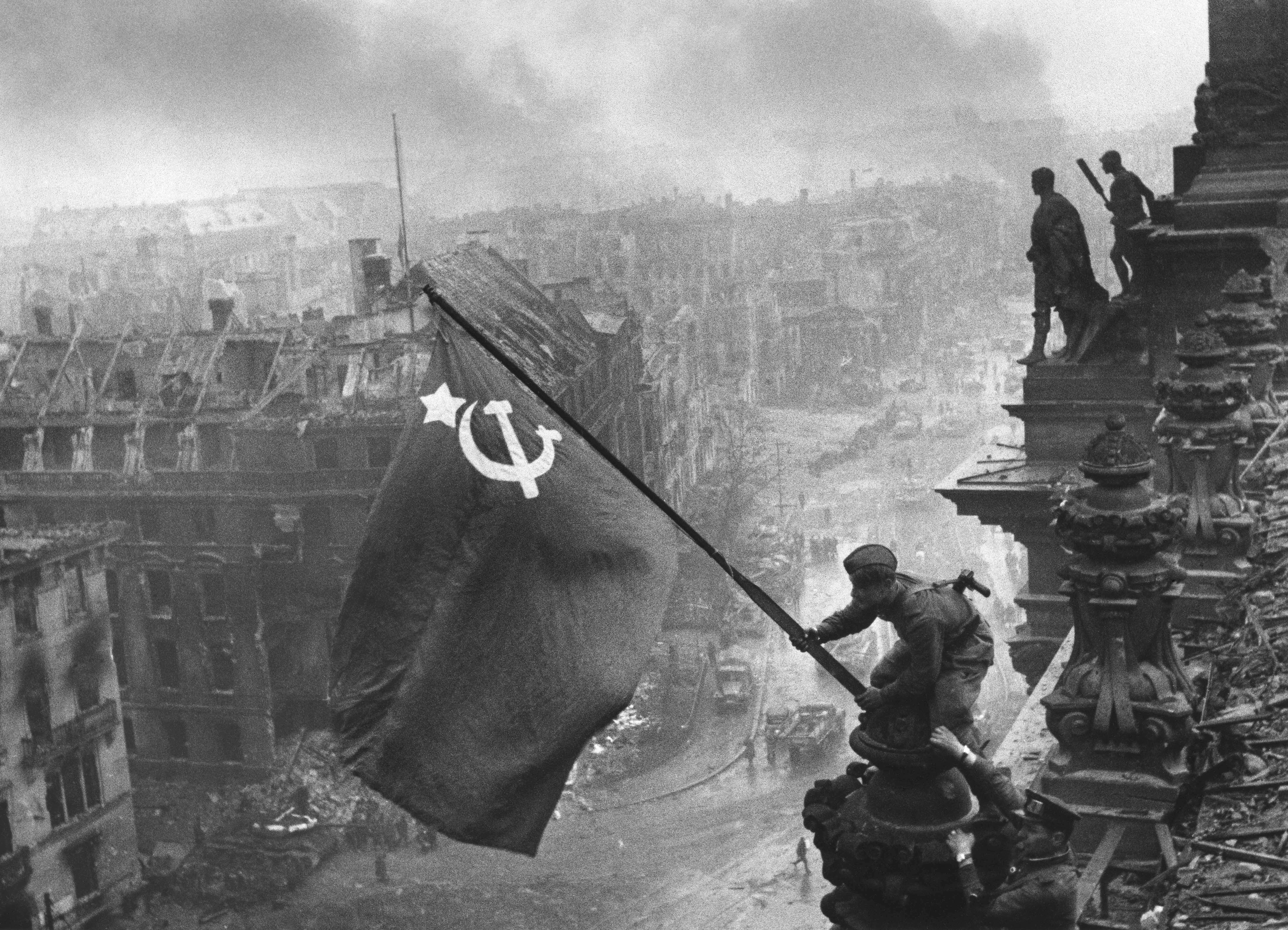
A Russian soldier raising the Soviet flag over the Reichstag during the Battle of Berlin

The tide began to turn in December 1941, when the invasion of the Soviet Union hit resistance in the Battle of Moscow and Hitler declared war on the US in the wake of the Japanese attack on Pearl Harbor. After surrender in North Africa and losing the Battle of Stalingrad in 1942–43, the Germans were forced into the defensive. By 1944, the US, Canada, France, and Britain were closing in on Germany in the West, while the Soviets were victoriously advancing in the East. In 1944–45, Soviet forces liberated Romania, Bulgaria, Hungary, Yugoslavia, Poland, Czechoslovakia, Austria, Denmark, and Norway. Nazi Germany collapsed as Berlin was taken by the Soviet Union's Red Army. 2,000,000 Soviet troops took part in the assault, and faced 750,000 German troops. 78,000–305,000 Soviets were killed, while 325,000 Germans were killed. Hitler committed suicide on 30 April 1945. The final German Instrument of Surrender was signed on 8 May 1945, marking the end of Nazi Germany.

By September 1945, Nazi Germany and its Axis partners had been defeated. Much of Europe lay in ruins, over 60 million people worldwide had been killed. World War II destroyed Germany's political and economic infrastructure, caused its partition, considerable loss of territory in the East, and historical legacy of guilt and shame.

== The Cold War, 1945–90 ==
=== Expulsion ===
At the Potsdam Conference, Germany was divided into four military occupation zones by the Allies and did not regain independence until 1949. The provinces east of the Oder-Neisse line were transferred to Poland and Russia (Kaliningrad oblast). Most of the remaining German population was expelled. Around 7 million Germans living in "west-shifted" Poland, and the 3 million in Czechoslovakia, were deported west.

=== Post-war chaos ===
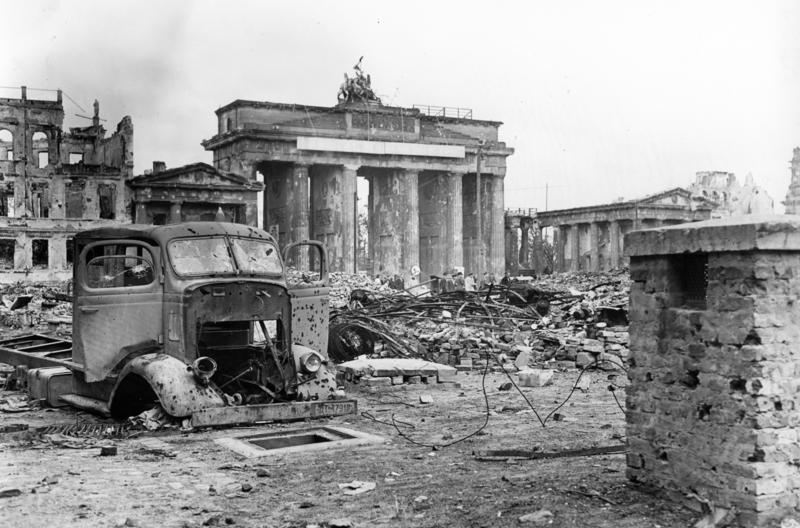
Devastation in Berlin after World War II, 1945

Occupation zone borders, 1947. Berlin, although within the Soviet zone, was also divided among the four powers. The areas in white to the east were transferred to Poland and the Soviet Union under the Potsdam Agreement.

German war dead was 9% out of a prewar population of 69,000,000, i.e. 6 million people. 11 million foreign workers and POWs left, while soldiers returned home and 14 million displaced German-speaking refugees, from the eastern provinces and Central and Eastern Europe, were expelled and moved to western German lands. The West German government estimated 2 million deaths due to the flight and expulsion of Germans and through forced labour in the Soviet Union. Some historians put it at 600,000. Denazification removed, imprisoned, or executed most top Nazi officials, but most middle and lower ranks were not affected. In the East, the Soviets crushed dissent and imposed another police state, often employing ex-Nazis in the Stasi. The Soviets extracted 23% of East German GNP for reparations; in the West reparations were minor.

In 1945–46 housing and food conditions were poor, as the disruption of transport, markets, and finances slowed return to normality. In the West, bombing had destroyed a quarter of the housing, and 10 million refugees from the east had crowded in, living in camps. Food production in 1946–48 was two-thirds of the prewar level. The end of the war stopped shipments of food seized from occupied nations that had sustained Germany. Coal production was down 60%, which negatively affected railroads, industry, and heating. Industrial production halved and reached prewar levels by 1950.

Allied economic policy originally was industrial disarmament and rebuilding agriculture. However, deindustrialization became impractical and the U.S. called for a strong German industrial base to stimulate European recovery. The U.S. shipped food in 1945–47 and made a $600 million loan in 1947 to rebuild German industry.

=== East Germany ===
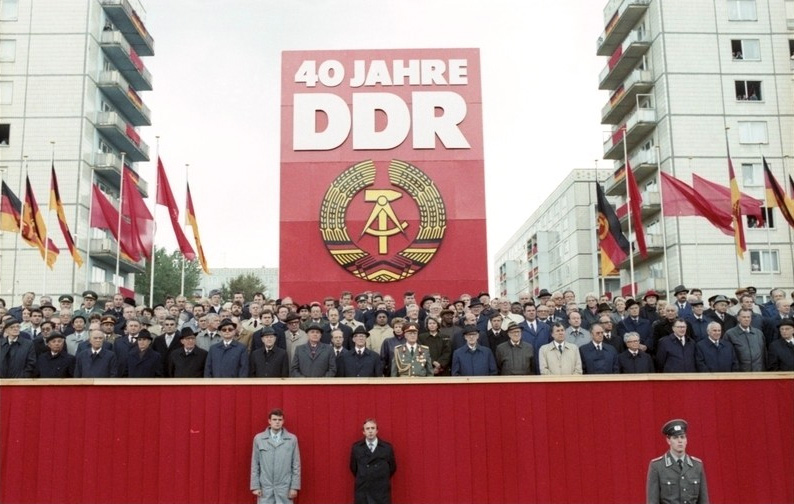
Erich Honecker and guests of honor like Mikhail Gorbachev celebrate the 40th (and last) anniversary of the socialist regime of the German Democratic Republic on 7 October 1989.

In October 1949, the Soviet zone became the "Deutsche Demokratische Republik" – "DDR" ("German Democratic Republic" – "GDR", simply "East Germany"), under control of the Socialist Unity Party. Neither country had a significant army until the 1950s, but East Germany built the Stasi into a powerful secret police.

East Germany was an Eastern bloc state under political and military control of the Soviet Union through her occupation forces and the Warsaw Treaty. Power was executed by leading members (Politburo) of the communist-controlled Socialist Unity Party (SED). A Soviet-style command economy was set up; later the GDR became the most advanced Comecon state. While East German propaganda was based on the benefits of the GDR's social programs and alleged threat of a West German invasion, many citizens looked to the West for freedom and economic prosperity.

Walter Ulbricht was the party leader from 1950 to 1971. Stalin assigned him the job of designing the German system that would centralize power in the Communist Party. 2.6 million people had fled East Germany by 1961 when Ulbricht built the Berlin Wall to stop this – shooting those who attempted flight. What the GDR called the "Anti-Fascist Protective Wall" was an embarrassment during the Cold War, but it did stabilize East Germany and postpone its collapse. Ulbricht was replaced because he failed to solve growing national crises, such as the worsening economy in 1969–70. The transition to Erich Honecker (General Secretary from 1971 to 1989) led to a change in policy to pay closer attention to the grievances of the proletariat. Honecker's plans were unsuccessful however, with dissent growing. In 1989, the regime collapsed due to economic problems, and therefore growing emigration towards the West.

East Germany's culture was shaped by Communism and particularly Stalinism. It was characterized as having produced a "Congested Feeling" as a result of policies criminalizing expression that deviated from government approved ideals, and through enforcement of Communist principles by force and intellectual repression by government agencies, particularly the Stasi. Some scholars claim the Party was committed to scientific knowledge, economic development, and social progress. However, others regard the state's Communist ideals as a deceptive method for government control.

=== West Germany ===
Flag of West Germany and unified Germany, 1949 – present

On 23 May 1949, the three western occupation zones were combined into the Federal Republic of Germany (FRG, West Germany). The government was formed under Chancellor Konrad Adenauer and his conservative CDU/CSU coalition. The capital was Bonn until it was moved to Berlin in 1990. West Germany was always much larger and richer than East Germany. Germany, especially Berlin, was a cockpit of the Cold War, with NATO and the Warsaw Pact assembling major military forces in west and east. However, there was never any combat.

==== Economic miracle ====
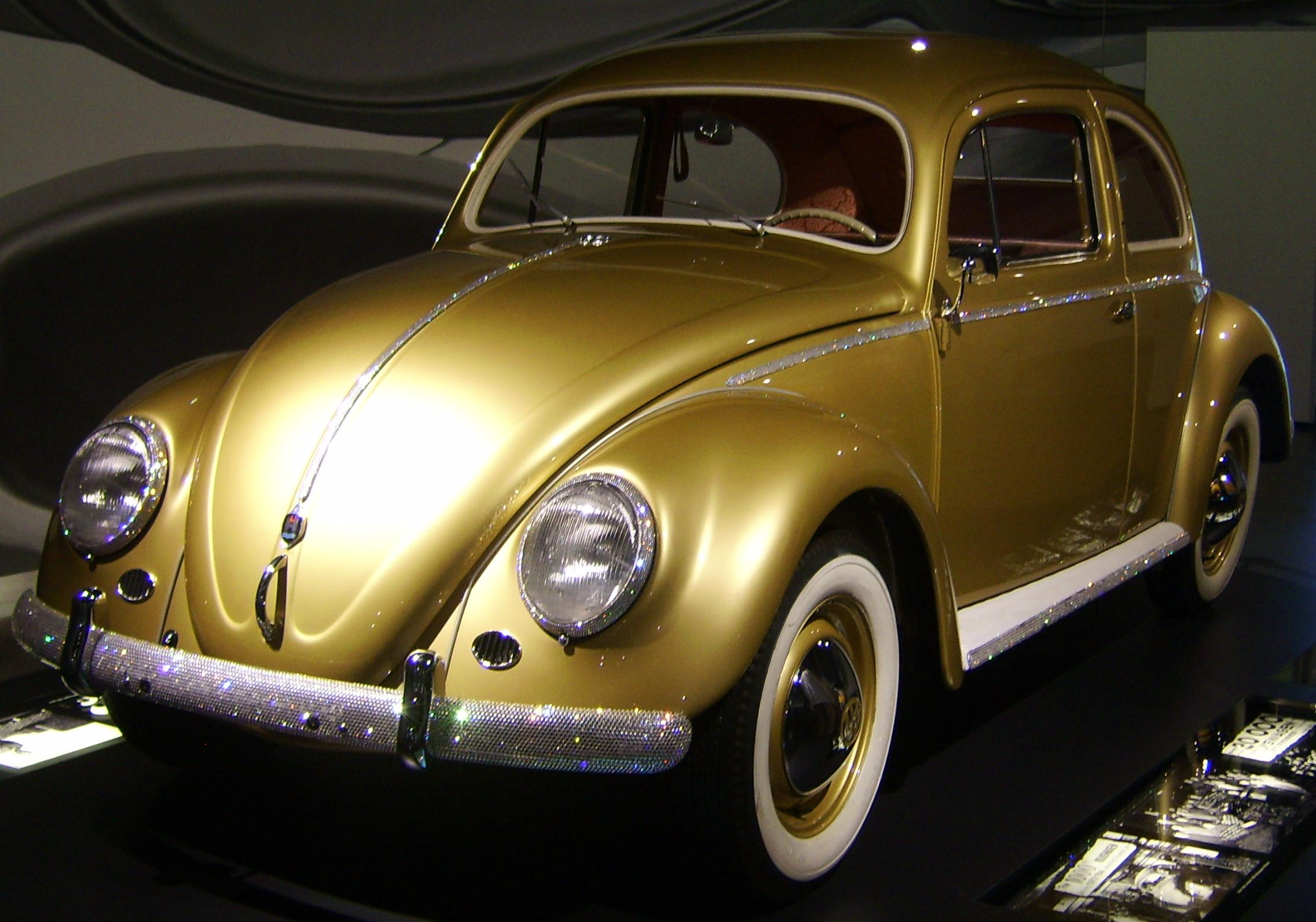
The Volkswagen Beetle was an icon of West German reconstruction.

West Germany enjoyed prolonged economic growth beginning in the 1950s (Wirtschaftswunder or "Economic Miracle"). Industrial production doubled from 1950 to 1957, and gross national product grew at 9% annually, providing the engine for the West European economy. Unions supported the new policies with postponed wage increases, minimized strikes, support for technological modernization, and worker representation on corporate boards of directors. The recovery was accelerated by the 1948 currency reform, US gifts of $1.4 billion through the Marshall Plan, breaking down of trade barriers and traditional practices, and the opening of a global market. The successful currency reform angered the Soviets, who cut off transport links between the western zones and West Berlin, known as the Berlin Blockade, which lasted from 1948 to 1949. America and Britain launched an airlift of food and coal and distributed the new currency in West Berlin as well. The city became economically integrated into West Germany. Until the mid-1960s, it served as "America's Berlin", symbolizing US' commitment to defending its freedom, which John F. Kennedy underscored during his 1963 visit.

West Germany gained legitimacy and respect, as it shed the reputation gained under the Nazis. It played a central role in the creation of European cooperation, joined NATO in 1955 and was a founding member of the European Economic Community in 1958.

==== Guest workers ====
With a booming economy short of unskilled workers, especially after the Berlin Wall cut off the flow of East Germans, the FRG negotiated migration agreements with Italy, Spain, Greece, and Turkey that brought in hundreds of thousands of temporary workers, called Gastarbeiter. The agreement with Turkey ended in 1973 but few returned. By 2010 there were about 4 million people of Turkish descent in Germany. The generation born in Germany attended German schools, but had a poor command of German or Turkish, and had low-skilled jobs or were unemployed.

==== Brandt and Ostpolitik ====
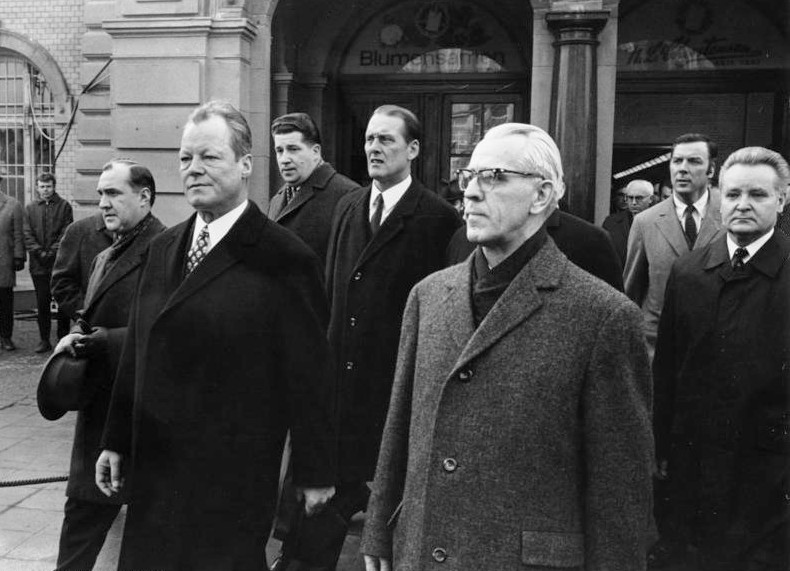
Brandt (left) and Willi Stoph in 1970, the first encounter of a Federal Chancellor with his East German counterpart

Willy Brandt was the West German Chancellor between 1969–74. The government sought to reduce tensions with the Soviet Union and improve relations with the German Democratic Republic, a policy known as the Ostpolitik. Relations between the two states had been difficult, with propaganda barrages in each direction. The outflow of talent from East Germany prompted the building of the Berlin Wall in 1961, which worsened Cold War tensions and prevented East Germans from travel. Although anxious to relieve serious hardships for divided families and reduce friction, Brandt's Ostpolitik was intent on holding to its concept of "two German states in one German nation".

Ostpolitik was opposed by the conservative elements in Germany, but won Brandt an international reputation and the Nobel Peace Prize in 1971. In 1973, both West and East Germany were admitted to the United Nations. The two countries exchanged permanent representatives in 1974, and, in 1987, East Germany's leader Erich Honecker paid an official state visit to West Germany.

==== Economic crisis of 1970s and Kohl ====
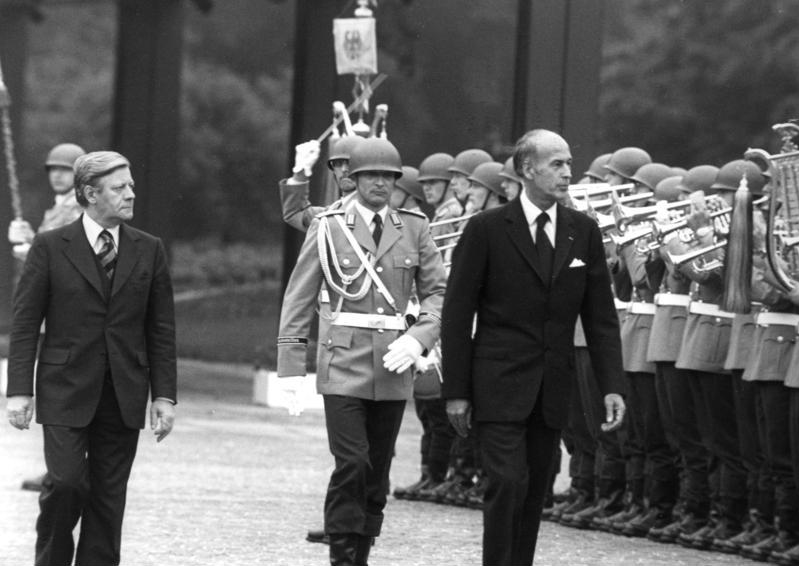
Helmut Schmidt, left, with French President Valéry Giscard d'Estaing (1977)

After 1973, Germany was hit by a world economic crisis, soaring oil prices, and high unemployment, which jumped from 300,000 in 1973 to 1.1 million in 1975. The Ruhr area was hardest hit, its expensive coal was no longer competitive. The steel industry went into decline, as its prices were undercut by lower-cost suppliers. The welfare system provided a safety net for unemployed workers, factories reduced their labour force and concentrated on high-profit specialty items.

A spy scandal forced Brandt to step down as Chancellor. He was replaced by Helmut Schmidt of the SPD, who served as Chancellor between 1974–82. Schmidt continued the Ostpolitik with less enthusiasm, he was more interested in reducing inflation. Debt grew as he borrowed to cover the cost of the expensive welfare state. After 1979, the Cold War turned hot again. The peace movement mobilized demonstrators to protest against American deployment of medium-range ballistic missiles. Schmidt supported deployment but was opposed by the left wing of the SPD and Brandt.

The pro-business Free Democratic Party (FDP) had been in coalition with the SPD, but changed direction. Led by Otto Graf Lambsdorff, it rejected Keynesian emphasis on consumer demand, and proposed to reduce welfare spending, and introduce policies to stimulate production and facilitate jobs. Lambsdorff argued the result would be growth, which would solve social and financial problems. The FDP switched allegiance to the CDU and Schmidt lost his parliamentary majority in 1982.

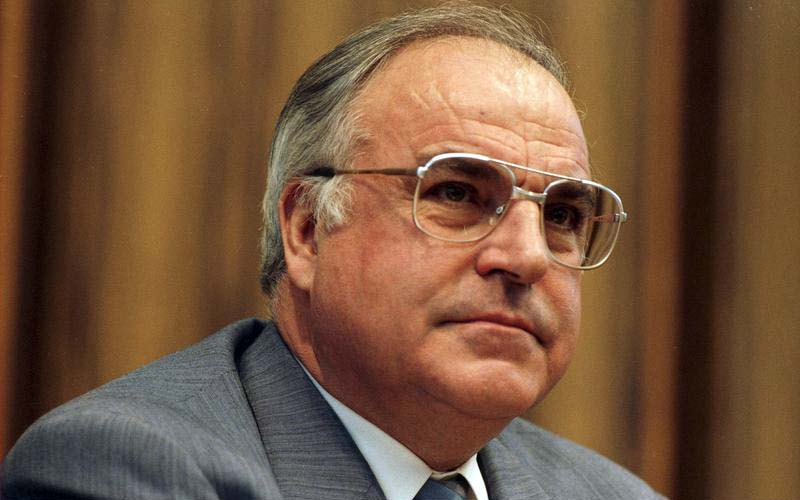
Helmut Kohl became first chancellor of a reunified Germany.

Helmut Kohl brought the conservatives back to power with a CDU/CSU-FDP coalition, and served as Chancellor until 1998. He orchestrated reunification with the approval of the Four Powers from World War II, who still had a voice in German affairs.

=== Reunification ===
During the summer of 1989, rapid changes known as the Peaceful Revolution took place in East Germany, which quickly led to German reunification. Growing numbers of East Germans emigrated to West Germany, many via Hungary after its reformist government opened its borders. The opening of the Iron Curtain between Austria and Hungary at the Pan-European Picnic in August 1989 triggered a chain reaction, at the end of which there was no GDR and the Eastern Bloc disintegrated. The greatest mass exodus since the construction of the Berlin Wall occurred and it became clear that the USSR, and rulers of the Eastern European satellite states, were not ready to keep the Iron Curtain. The GDR no longer received effective support from the other communist Eastern Bloc countries. Thousands of East Germans tried to reach the West by staging sit-ins at West German diplomatic facilities in East European capitals. The exodus generated demands within East Germany for political change, and mass demonstrations in several cities continued to grow.

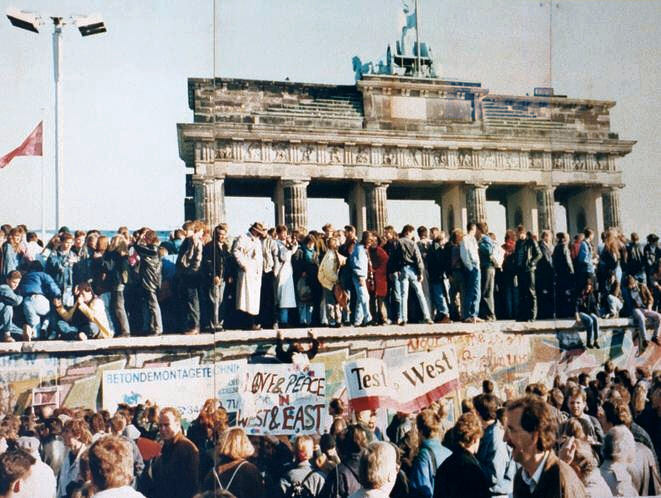
The fall of the Berlin Wall, November 1989

Unable to stop the civil unrest, Erich Honecker resigned in October, and on 9 November, East German authorities unexpectedly allowed East German citizens to enter West Berlin and West Germany. Hundreds of thousands of people took advantage; new crossing points were opened in the Berlin Wall and along the border with West Germany. This led to the acceleration of the process of reforms in East Germany that ended with the dissolution of East Germany, and German reunification on 3 October 1990.

== Federal Republic of Germany, 1990–present ==
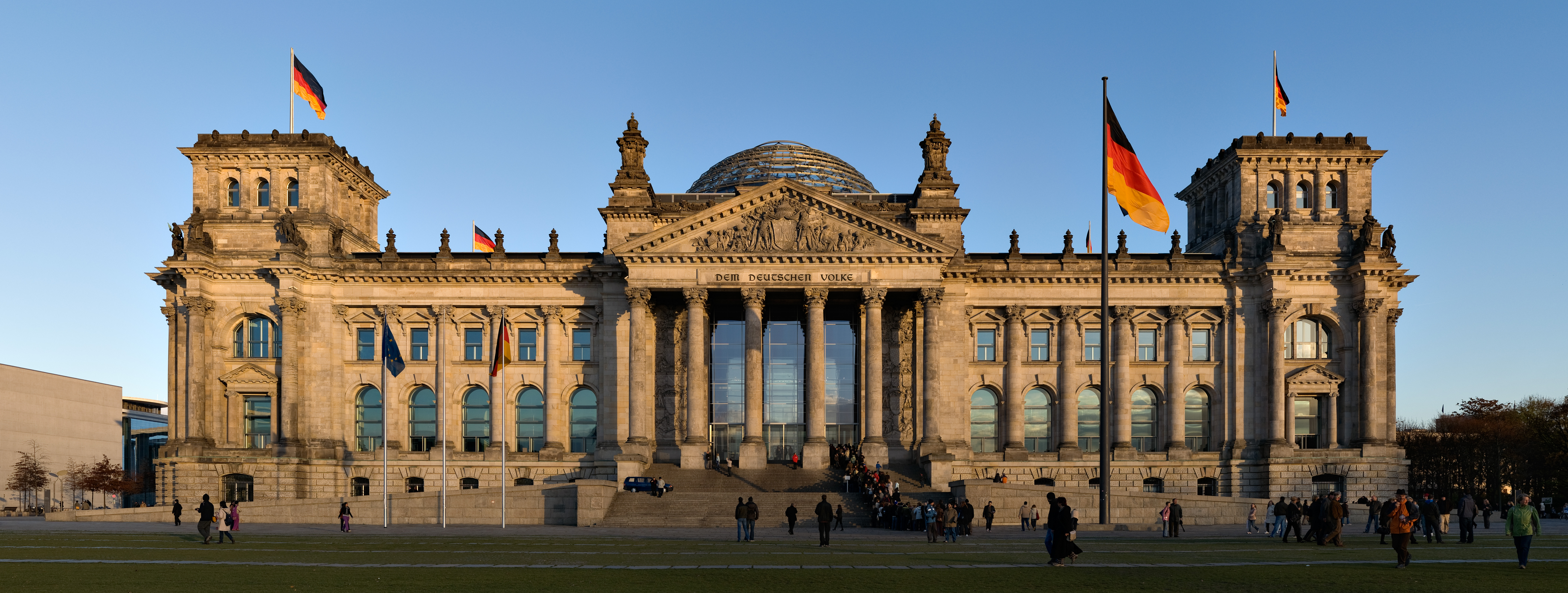
The Reichstag in Berlin – the seat of the German parliament since 1999.

Kohl lost in a landslide victory to the left in 1998, and was succeeded by the SPD's Gerhard Schröder. Schröder positioned himself as centrist. He proposed Agenda 2010: tax cuts; labour market deregulation; modernizing welfare by reducing entitlements; decreasing bureaucratic obstacles for small businesses; and providing low-interest loans to local governments. Germany adopted the Euro in January 1999.

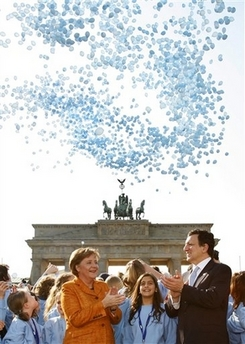
German chancellor Angela Merkel with José Barroso in 2007 promoting the Treaty of Lisbon to reform the EU

In the 2005 elections, the Christian Democratic Union (CDU)'s Angela Merkel became the first female chancellor, and led the country for 16 years. In 2009 the government approved a €50 billion stimulus plan in response to the Great Recession. Germany also sponsored a massive financial rescue in the wake of the Euro area crisis.

Among the major political projects of the 21st century have been European integration, the energy transition to sustainable energy, the debt brake for balanced budgets, measures to increase the fertility rate (pronatalism), and high-tech strategies for the Fourth Industrial Revolution. With France, Germany has played a leading role in the European Union. Germany has been a key supporter in admitting East European countries to the EU, and the creation of a more unified and capable European political, defence and security apparatus. Schröder expressed an interest in a permanent seat for Germany on the UN Security Council. Since 1990, the German Bundeswehr has participated in peacekeeping and disaster relief operations abroad. German troops formed part of the International Security Assistance Force in the War in Afghanistan, resulting in the first German casualties in combat missions since World War II.

Following the 2011 Fukushima nuclear accident in Japan, German public opinion turned against nuclear power in Germany, which produced a quarter of its electricity. Merkel announced plans to close down all nuclear power plants over the following decade, and a commitment to rely more on wind and other energy sources, in addition to coal and gas.

Germany was significantly affected by the 2015 European migrant crisis, as it became the final destination of choice for many asylum seekers from Africa and the Middle East entering the EU. The country took in over a million refugees and migrants, and developed a quota system which redistributed migrants around its federal states based on their income and existing population density. The decision by Merkel to authorize unrestricted entry led to criticism and was a major factor in the rise of the far-right party Alternative for Germany which entered the Bundestag in the 2017 federal election.

=== Covid to present ===
In January 2020, Germany confirmed its first Covid case and went into lockdown in March. In December vaccines were administered. Germany registered 180,000 excess deaths and Covid measures were relaxed in 2022.

In December 2021, after the SPD won the federal election, Olaf Scholz was sworn in as chancellor. He formed a coalition with the Green Party and liberal Free Democrats. Following the 2022 Russian invasion of Ukraine, Germany's previous foreign policy towards Russia was criticized for having been too soft. Germany announced a major shift, pledging a €100bn for the Bundeswehr, and raising the budget to above 2% of GDP. As of April 2023, 1 million refugees from Ukraine were recorded in Germany.

CDU/CSU won the 2025 German federal election. However, far-right Alternative for Germany, AfD, doubled its support to become the second biggest party with 21%. SPD had its worst performance in decades with 16%. In May 2025, Friedrich Merz was sworn in as chancellor, and formed a coalition with his Christian Democrats, its sister party the Christian Social Union, and the Social Democrats.

== See also ==
- Historiography of Germany
- Conservatism in Germany
  - Liberalism in Germany
- Economic history of Germany
- History of German foreign policy
- History of German journalism
- History of the Jews in Germany
- History of women in Germany
- List of chancellors of Germany
- List of German monarchs
  - Family tree of German monarchs
- Military history of Germany
- Names of Germany
- Politics of Germany
- Territorial evolution of Germany
- Timeline of German history
- Timeline of the German Empire
- Timeline of the Weimar Republic
