= OER =

OER or Oer may refer to:

== Science ==
- Oxygen enhancement ratio, effect magnitude of ionizing radiation due to the presence of oxygen
- Oxygen Evolution Reaction, the formation of oxygen by electrochemical reduction of water

== Transport ==
- Odakyu Electric Railway, a Japanese railway company
- Oregon Electric Railway, an interurban railroad line in Oregon, United States
- Örnsköldsvik Airport in Örnsköldsvik, Sweden

== Other uses ==
- Oer family, a German noble family
- Oer-Erkenschwick, a town in North Rhine-Westphalia, Germany
- Offense efficiency rating, the average number of points scored per shot by a basketball player
- Officer Evaluation Report, an evaluation form used by the United States Army
- Open educational resources, open documents that are useful for teaching, learning, educational, assessment and research purposes
- Owner’s Equivalent Rent, an economic metric for housing prices often used in the calculation of market baskets
