= Prince Constantin of Liechtenstein =

Liechtensteiner prince (1972–2023)

Prince Constantin
- Count of Rietberg
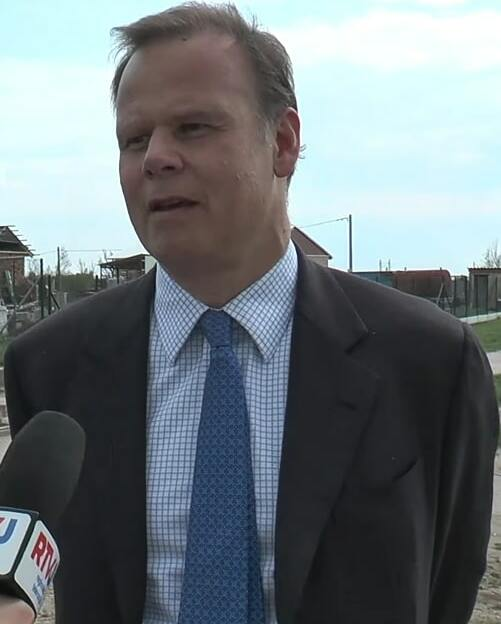
- Constantin in 2022
- Born: 15 March 1972; St Gallen Cantonal Hospital, St. Gallen, Canton of St. Gallen, Switzerland
- Died: 5 December 2023 (aged 51)
- Burial: Cathedral of St. Florin, Vaduz, Liechtenstein
- Spouse: Countess Marie Kálnoky de Kőröspatak (m. 1999)
- Issue: Prince Moritz; Princess Georgina; Prince Benedikt
Names
- Constantin Ferdinand Maria
- House: Liechtenstein
- Father: Hans-Adam II, Prince of Liechtenstein
- Mother: Countess Marie Kinsky of Wchinitz and Tettau

Prince Constantin of Liechtenstein (Constantin Ferdinand Maria; 15 March 1972 – 5 December 2023), known professionally as Constantin Liechtenstein, was a businessman and a member of the Princely House of Liechtenstein. He was the third son of Prince Hans-Adam II and his wife, Countess Marie Kinsky of Wchinitz and Tettau. Constantin was the chief executive officer of the LGT Group from 2020 to 2023.

== Education and career ==
Constantin attended the primary school in Vaduz-Ebenholz and entered the Liechtensteinisches Gymnasium in 1983, which he graduated from in 1991. He enrolled at the Paris Lodron University of Salzburg in 1992 and graduated in 1997 with a master's degree in law. He then worked for Raiffeisen Private Equity Management and the American investment bank Brown Brothers Harriman. Prince Constantin then became the managing partner of Grünwald Equity Beteiligungs-GmbH until 2011. As of 2012, he became General Director and chairman of the board of directors of the Prince of Liechtenstein Foundation and was responsible for the business areas of agriculture and forestry, renewable energy, and the family's real estate affairs. He worked for the Liechtenstein Group from 2020 until his death. In addition, he had other functions such as chairman of the board of directors of Rice Tec AG, member of the advisory council of LGT Austria and member of the L-GAM Investment Committee.

In addition, Prince Constantin was appointed a member of the Austrian Council for Sustainable Development in Vienna, whose primary goals are the implementation of the Sustainable Development Goals in the UN 2030 Agenda for Sustainable Development, concretization and visualization of sustainability as well as the support and acceleration of corresponding activities in business, society, politics, science, media and the public.

== Other activities ==
Prince Constantin and his family attended the annual Liechtenstein National Day. Prince Constantin was a patron of the Football Is More Foundation and attended the annual Football Is More Conferences. In May 2014, Prince Constantin visited The Lower Austrian Forest Youth Games which were held in Sparbach Nature Park, the oldest nature park in Austria owned by the Liechtenstein princely family. There, he met sixth-grade students and praised the games as to "see nature as an overall view". In March 2015, he hosted delegation of Liechtenstein's Members of Parliament at Wilfersdorf Castle in Wilfersdorf. In August 2015, he and his wife attended a charity concert hosted by his sister-in-law Hereditary Princess Sophie at the Liechtenstein City Palace. The money raised was used for a joined project of Austrian and Liechtenstein Red Cross to help people in Eastern Ukraine. In April 2017, he and his family with other Liechtenstein princely family members visited the Vatican to meet Pope Francis. In September 2017, he and his sister Princess Tatjana attended the annual Liechtenstein Reception in Vienna.

Prince Constantin initiated and hosted the Summer Rhapsody at the Liechtenstein Garden Palace in Vienna, Austria on 31 July 2020. In March 2022, Prince Constantin with his father and his siblings Hereditary Prince Alois and Princess Tatjana attended the opening of the exhibition "True Prince — Joseph Wenzel and His Art" at the Liechtenstein Palace. On 28 April 2022, Prince Constantin visited Hrušky, Czech Republic with other employees of the Prince of Liechtenstein Foundation and donated 5 million koruna to the village to restore the garden and playground of the kindergarten after they had been destroyed by a tornado.

== Personal life and death ==
Prince Constantin married Countess Marie Gabriele Franziska Kálnoky de Kőröspatak, a Hungarian aristocrat, in a civil ceremony on 14 May 1999 in Vaduz, Liechtenstein and in a religious ceremony on 18 July 1999 in Číčov, Slovakia. The couple had three children:

- Prince Moritz Emanuel Maria of Liechtenstein, Count of Rietberg (born on 27 May 2003 in New York City, New York, U.S.)
- Princess Georgina "Gina" Maximiliana Tatiana Maria of Liechtenstein, Countess of Rietberg (born on 23 July 2005 in Vienna, Austria)
- Prince Benedikt Ferdinand Hubertus Maria of Liechtenstein, Count of Rietberg (born on 18 May 2008 in Vienna, Austria).

Princess Marie was born on 16 July 1975 in Graz, Austria, as the sixth daughter of Count Alois Kálnoky de Kőröspatak (1931–2022) and Baroness Sieglinde von Oer (b. 1935). Marie worked for Austrian Broadcasting Corporation and the Bismarck Media Communications in New York City as a marketing specialist before working for The Prince of Liechtenstein's Winery Cellars as a sommelière.

Constantin died unexpectedly on 5 December 2023, at the age of 51.

== Titles, styles, and arms ==
Styles of Prince Constantin of Liechtenstein
- Reference style: His Serene Highness
- Spoken style: Your Serene Highness

Constantin was styled as His Serene Highness Prince Constantin of Liechtenstein, Count of Rietberg. He used the coat of arms of the princely house.
