= Bellevue Palace, Germany =

Official residence of the German president

Bellevue Palace
- Schloss Bellevue
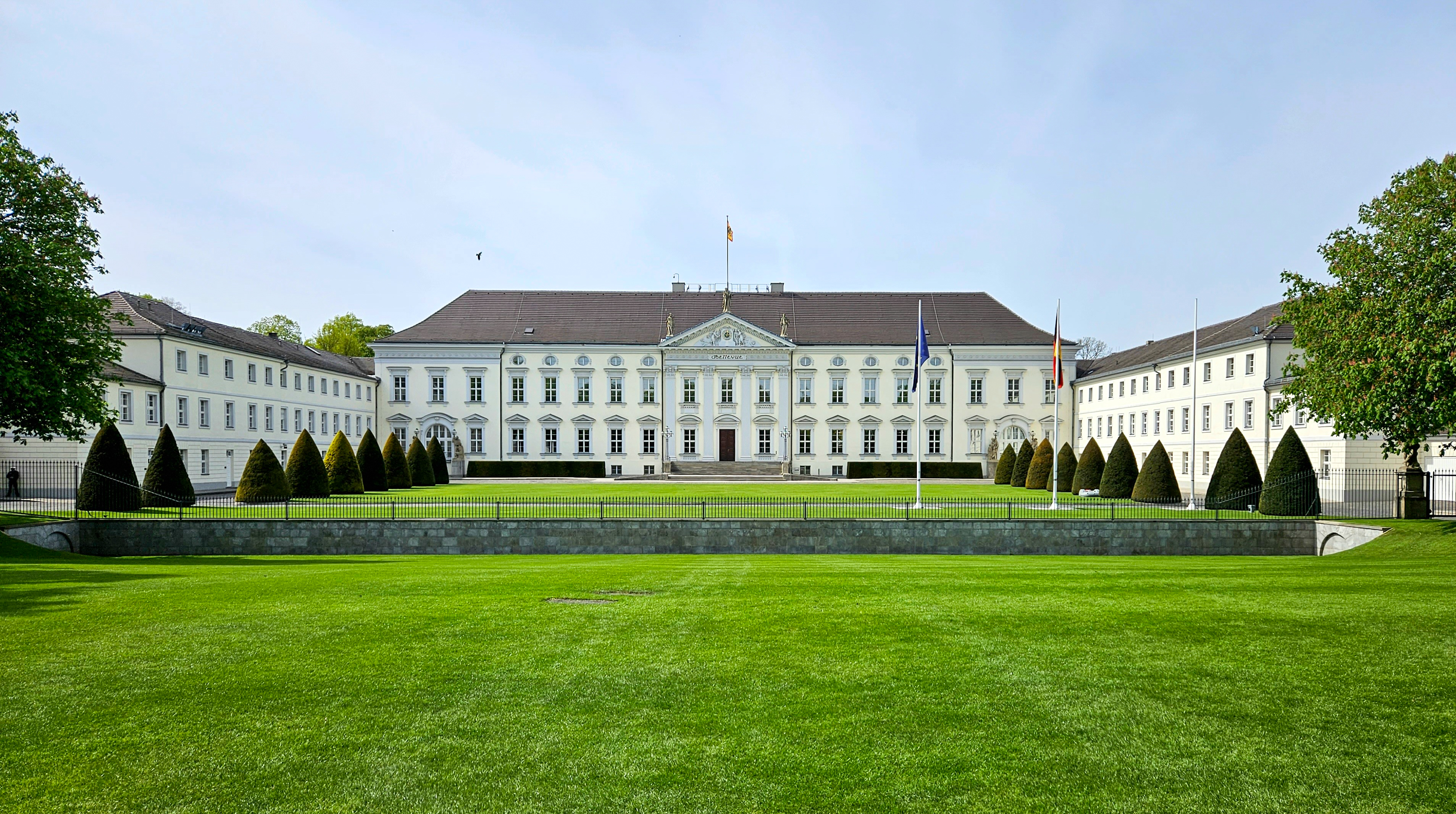

- Location within Central Berlin

General information
- Architectural style: Neoclassical
- Location: Spreeweg 1; 10557 Berlin-Tiergarten, Germany
- Coordinates: 52°31′03″N 13°21′12″E
- Construction started: 13 October 1785
- Completed: 1786

Design and construction
- Architect: Michael Philipp Boumann

Bellevue Palace (German: Schloss Bellevue, pronounced [ʃlɔs bɛlˈvyː]), located in Berlin's Tiergarten district, has been the official residence of the president of Germany since 1994. The schloss is situated on the banks of the Spree river, near the Berlin Victory Column, along the northern edge of the Großer Tiergarten park. Its name – the French for "beautiful view" – derives from its scenic prospect over the Spree's course.

== Overview ==
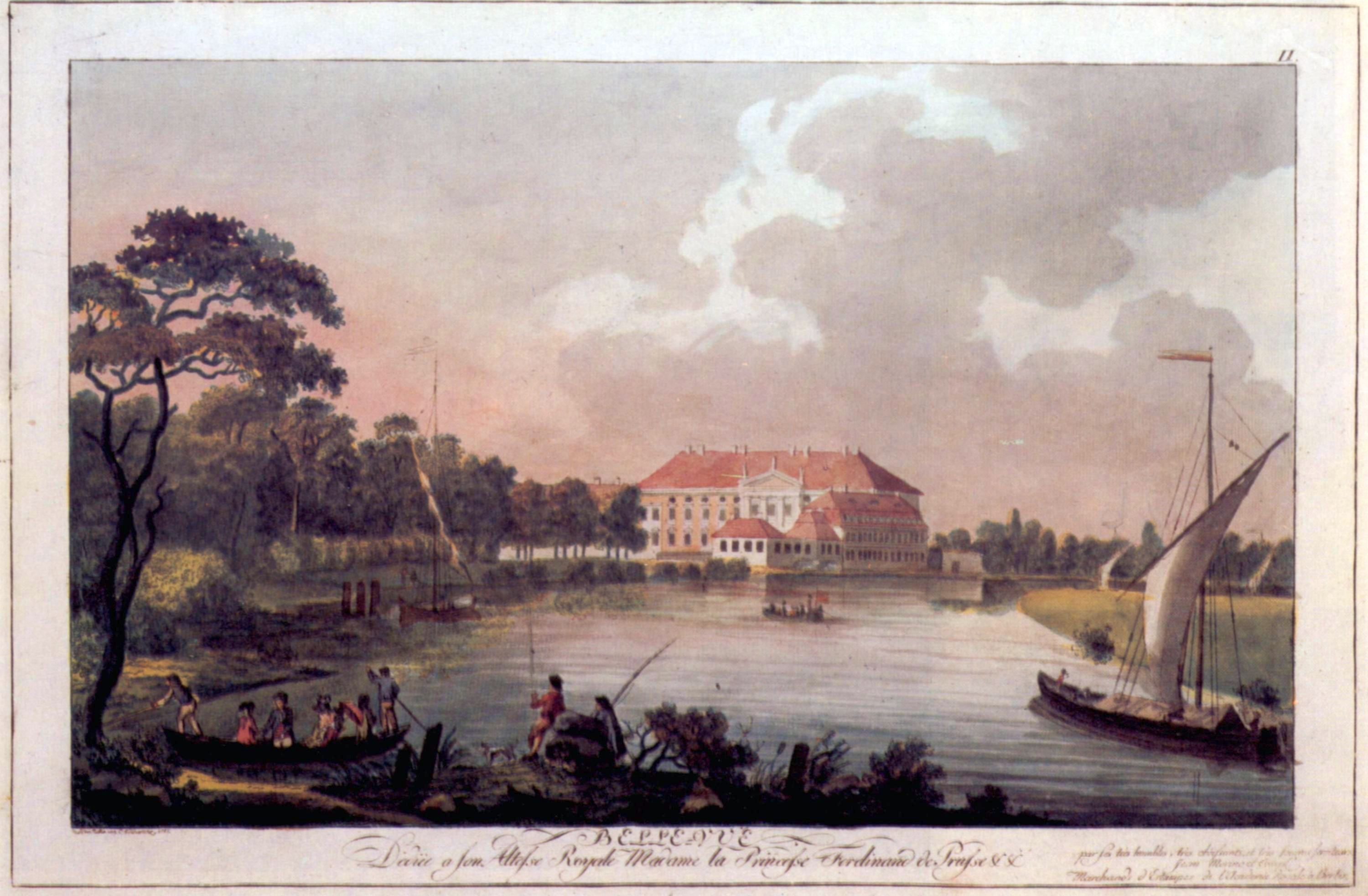
Bellevue in 1797

Designed by architect Michael Philipp Boumann (1747–1803), Schloss Bellevue was erected in 1786 as a residence for Prince Augustus Ferdinand of Prussia, Master of the Knights of the Order of Saint John and youngest brother of King Frederick II of Prussia. There were preexisting structures on the site, including the manor house which King Frederick's architect Georg Wenzeslaus von Knobelsdorff had built for himself in 1743, which was demolished, and a leather factory on the Spree river waterfront which was converted into the right side-wing. The palace was named Bellevue since it had a clear view of the monumental domed tower of Schloss Charlottenburg before the 1880s, when the viaduct of the Berlin Stadtbahn was built nearby. It was the first Neoclassical building in Germany, characterized by its Corinthian pilasters, with wings on either side ("Ladies' wing" and "River Spree wing"). The only room that kept its original decoration is a ballroom on the upper floor designed by Carl Gotthard Langhans, the architect of the Brandenburg Gate. The palace is surrounded by a park of about 20 hectares.

In 1843, King Frederick William IV of Prussia inherited Bellevue from Prince Augustus of Prussia, a son of the builder. In 1865 it became the residence of his niece Princess Alexandrine after her marriage to Duke William of Mecklenburg-Schwerin. It served the royal and imperial princes of the Hohenzollern dynasty until the German Revolution of 1918–19. The last German emperor, Wilhelm II, used it as a guest house as well as a private school for his seven children.

The Free State of Prussia acquired the property from the former emperor in 1928 and used it as a museum of ethnography during the 1930s before being renovated as a guest house for the Nazi government which had purchased it in 1938. However, from 1939, it was occupied by Otto Meissner, the head of the Office of the President of Germany. It was there that Soviet foreign minister Vyacheslav Molotov stayed with his retinue during his visit to Berlin in November 1940. During World War II, the palace was severely damaged by strategic bombing and in the 1945 Battle of Berlin, before being substantially refurbished in the 1950s. Inaugurated by President Theodor Heuss in 1959, it served as the secondary residence of the West German president, a pied-à-terre in West Berlin to supplement his primary residence at the Hammerschmidt Villa in Bonn.

In 1986–87, Federal President Richard von Weizsäcker had the interior of the palace completely redesigned by the architect Otto Meitinger in order to adapt the rooms to the character of the external historical appearance, whereby the sequence of rooms was also restored according to plans from the time before the destruction. Weizsäcker had the palace furnished with part of the valuable Empire style furniture collection from Wilhelmshöhe Palace in Kassel as a permanent loan and initiated the exchange of paintings with German museums in order to present guests with classical and modern German art. However, two rooms have been preserved with their furnishings in the style of post-war modernism. In 1994, after German reunification, Weizsäcker made it his primary residence.

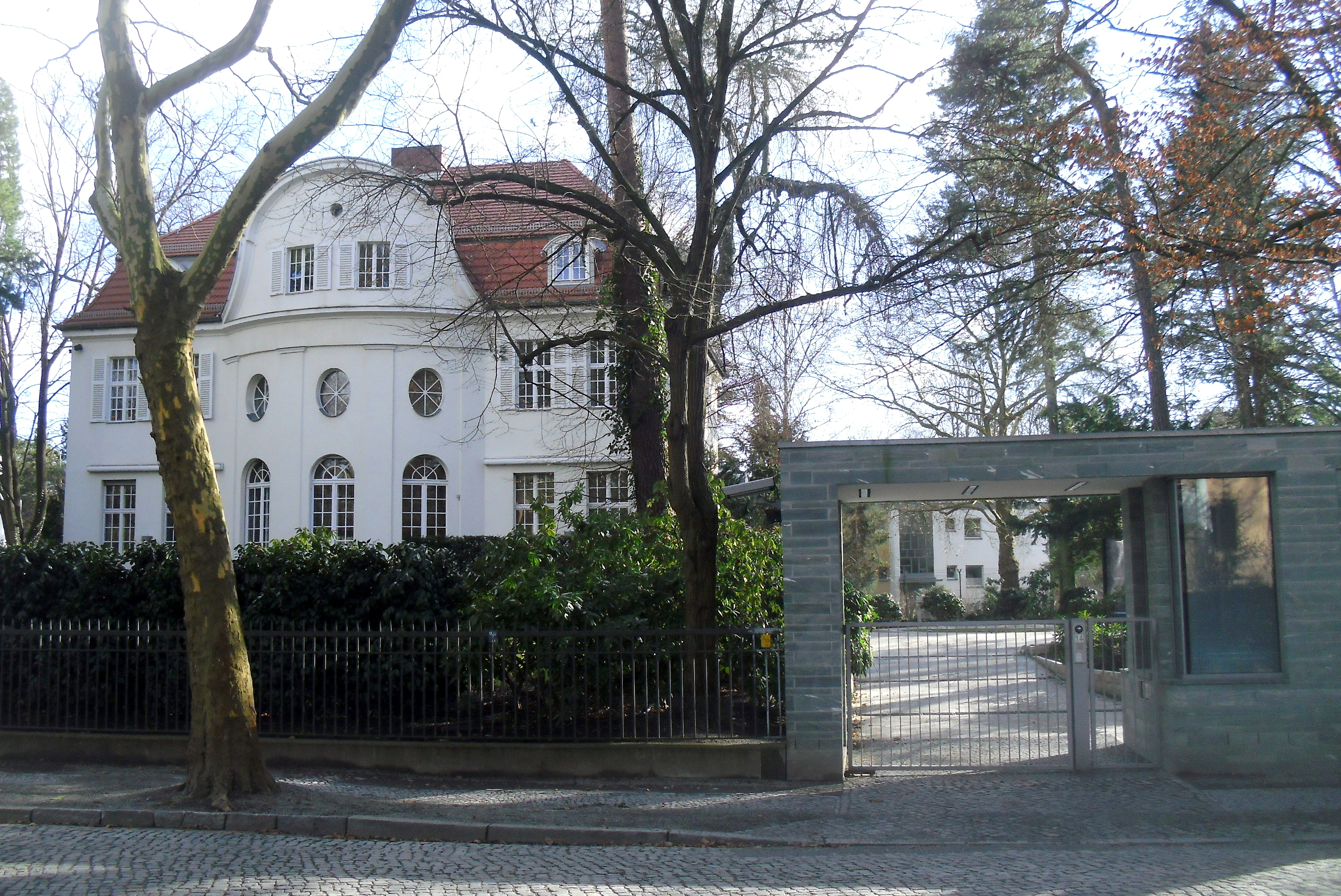
Villa Wurmbach in Dahlem, since 2004 private residence of the Presidents

A modern oval office building was built in 1998 in a section of the park near the palace to house the offices of the affiliated Bundespräsidialamt ("Office of the Federal President"), a federal agency.

Roman Herzog, president from 1994 to 1999, remains the only officeholder who lived at Bellevue while incumbent. The palace was reconstructed again in 2004 and 2005 to replace ailing infrastructure; during this period, President Horst Köhler used nearby Charlottenburg Palace for representative purposes. Bellevue became the president's primary official seat again in January 2006, but since then has not included living quarters. Instead, the federal president now lives in a government-owned villa in Dahlem, a suburban district of southwestern Berlin, which had previously been the Berlin lodging of the West-German chancellors since 1962.

== Presidential standard ==
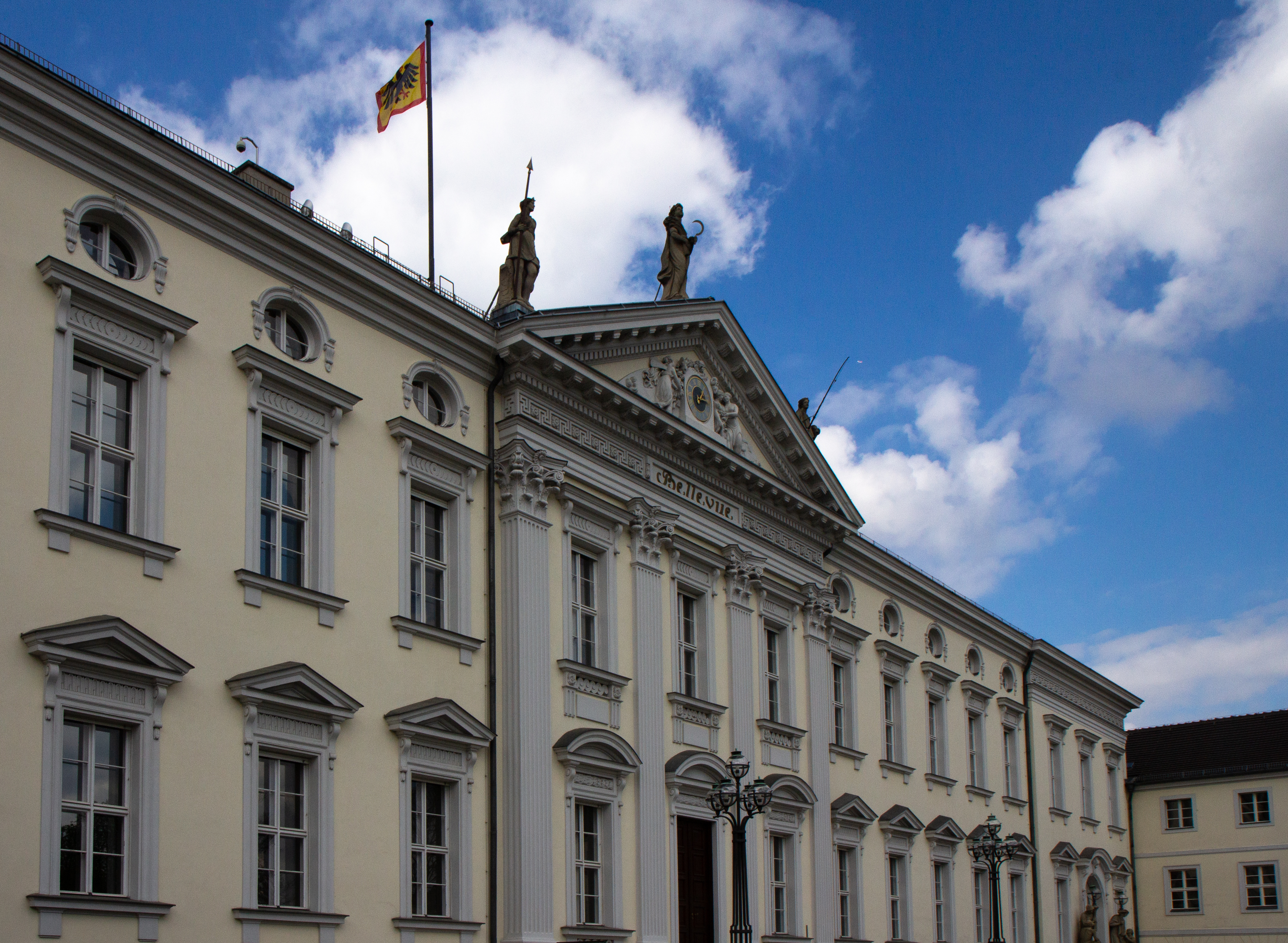
The presidential standard is flown at Bellevue.

Contrary to popular belief, the presidential standard is flown at the palace even on many days when the president is not in Berlin. It is lowered only when the president takes up official residence elsewhere – e.g. on the occasion of a state visit, when the standard is raised over a temporary residence abroad, or over the second residence at Villa Hammerschmidt. When away on vacation, Schloss Bellevue remains the official residence over which the standard is flown.

== Großer Tiergarten statues ==
In 1945, according to testimony reported in the 1995 documentary film On the Desperate Edge of Now, Berlin citizens buried statues of historical military figures from the Großer Tiergarten in the grounds of the palace to prevent their destruction. They were not recovered until 1993.

== Gallery ==
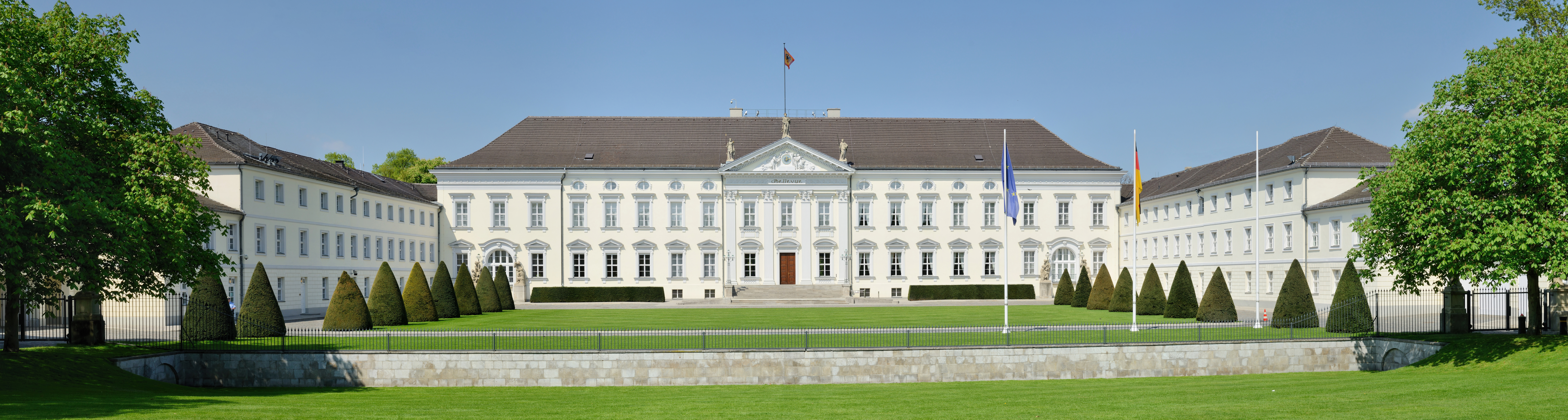
Bellevue and its side wings
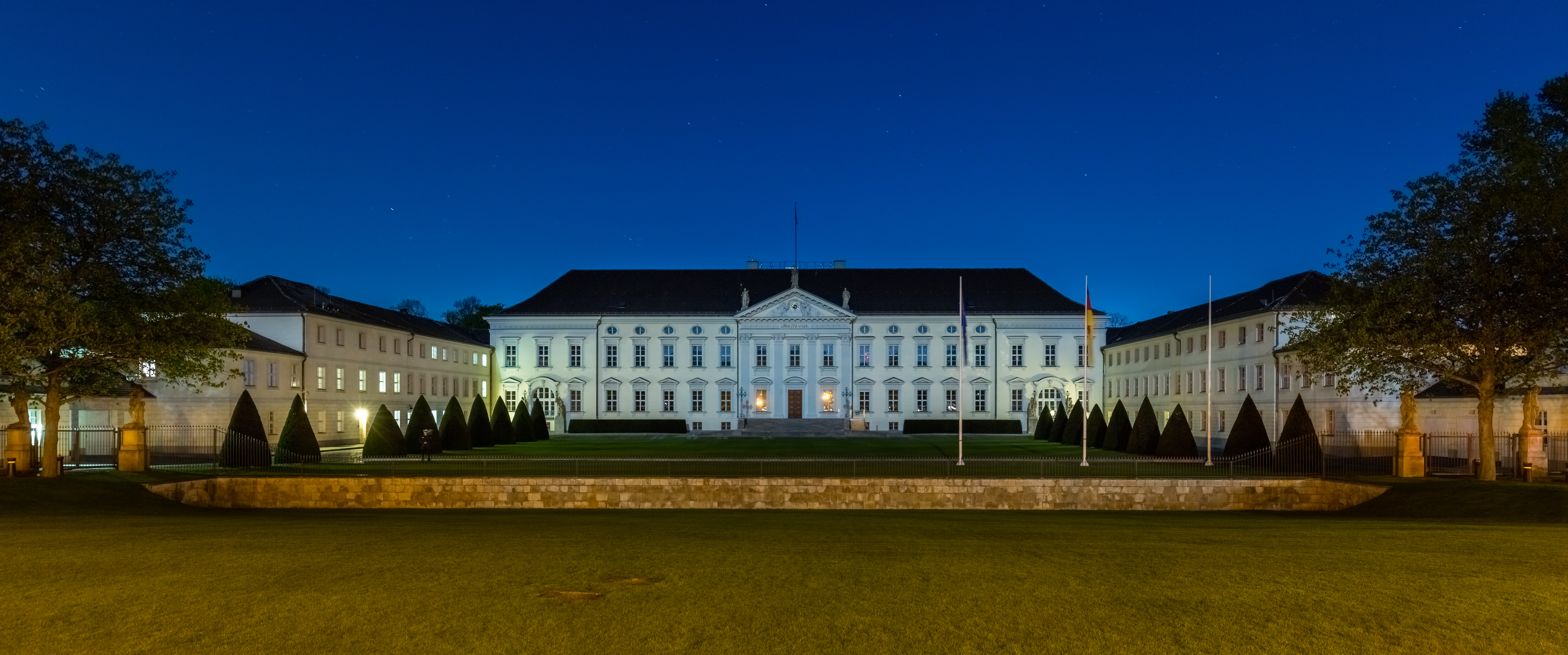
Nighttime view of Bellevue Palace

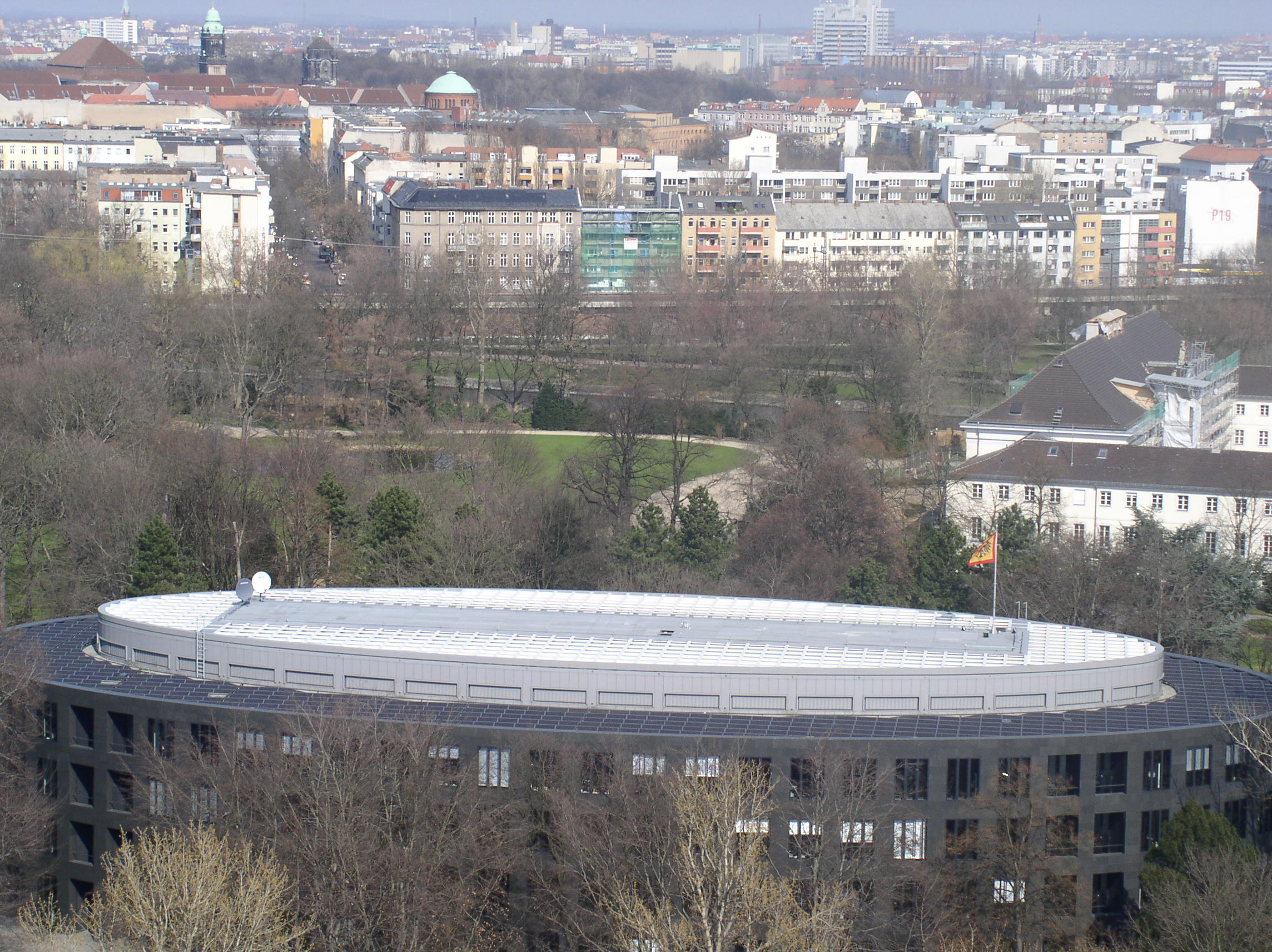
The Federal Presidency's oval office building from the Victory Column, with the palace and Moabit quarter in the background
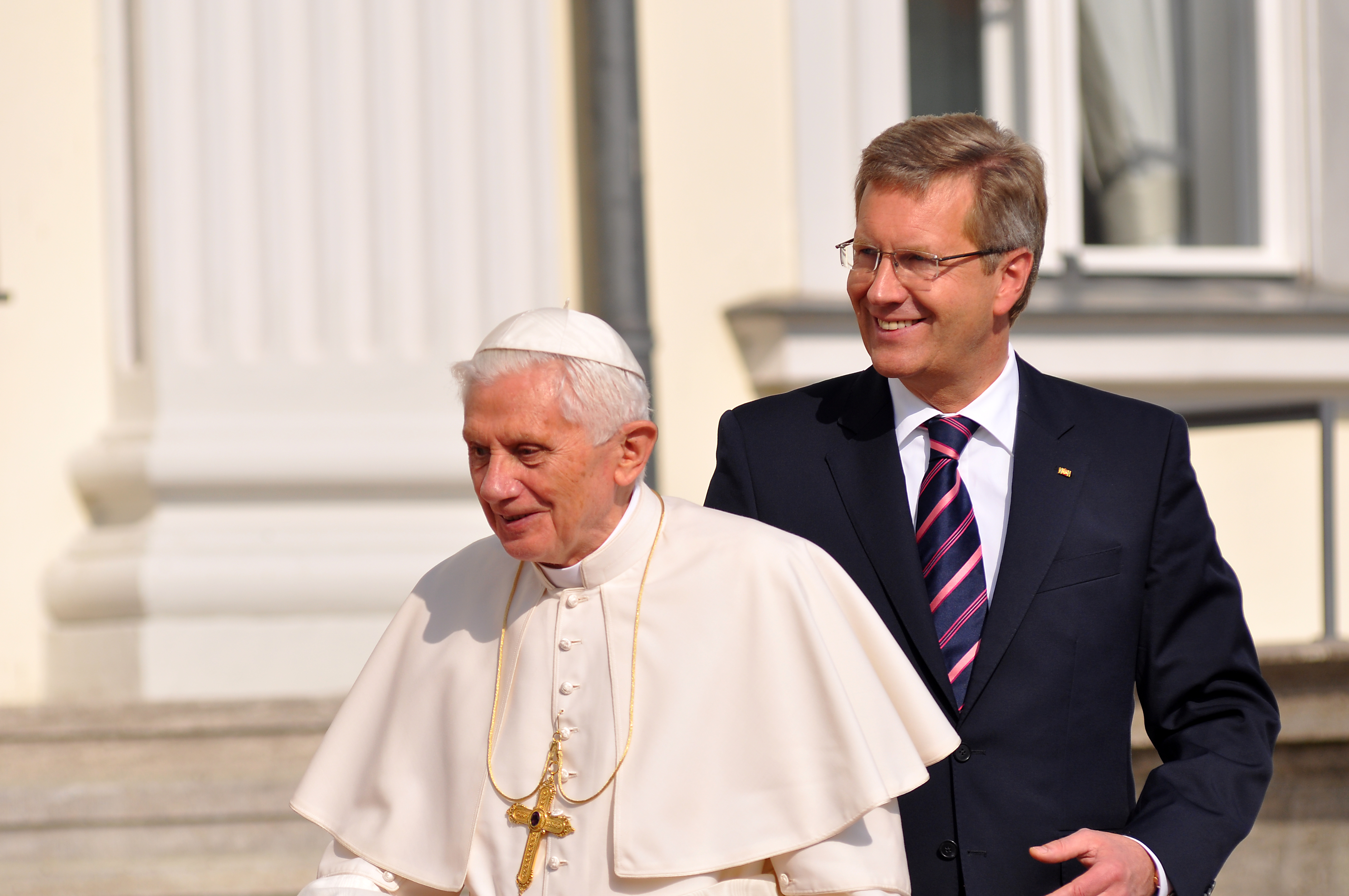
President Christian Wulff receiving Pope Benedict XVI

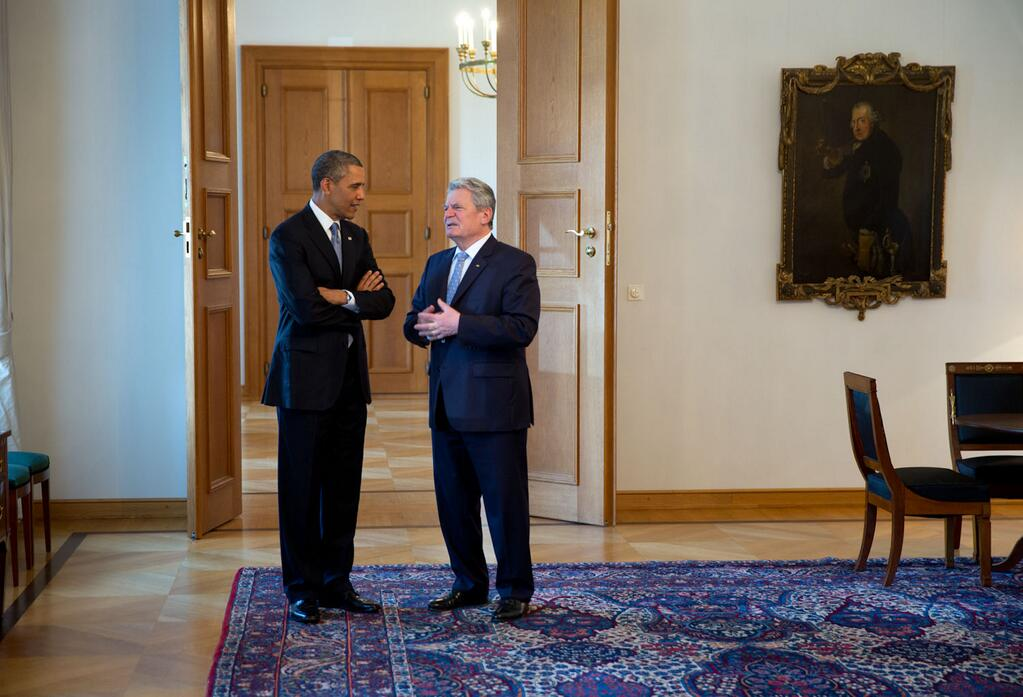
Presidents Barack Obama and Joachim Gauck at Bellevue, in the background a version of Graff's portrait of Frederick the Great

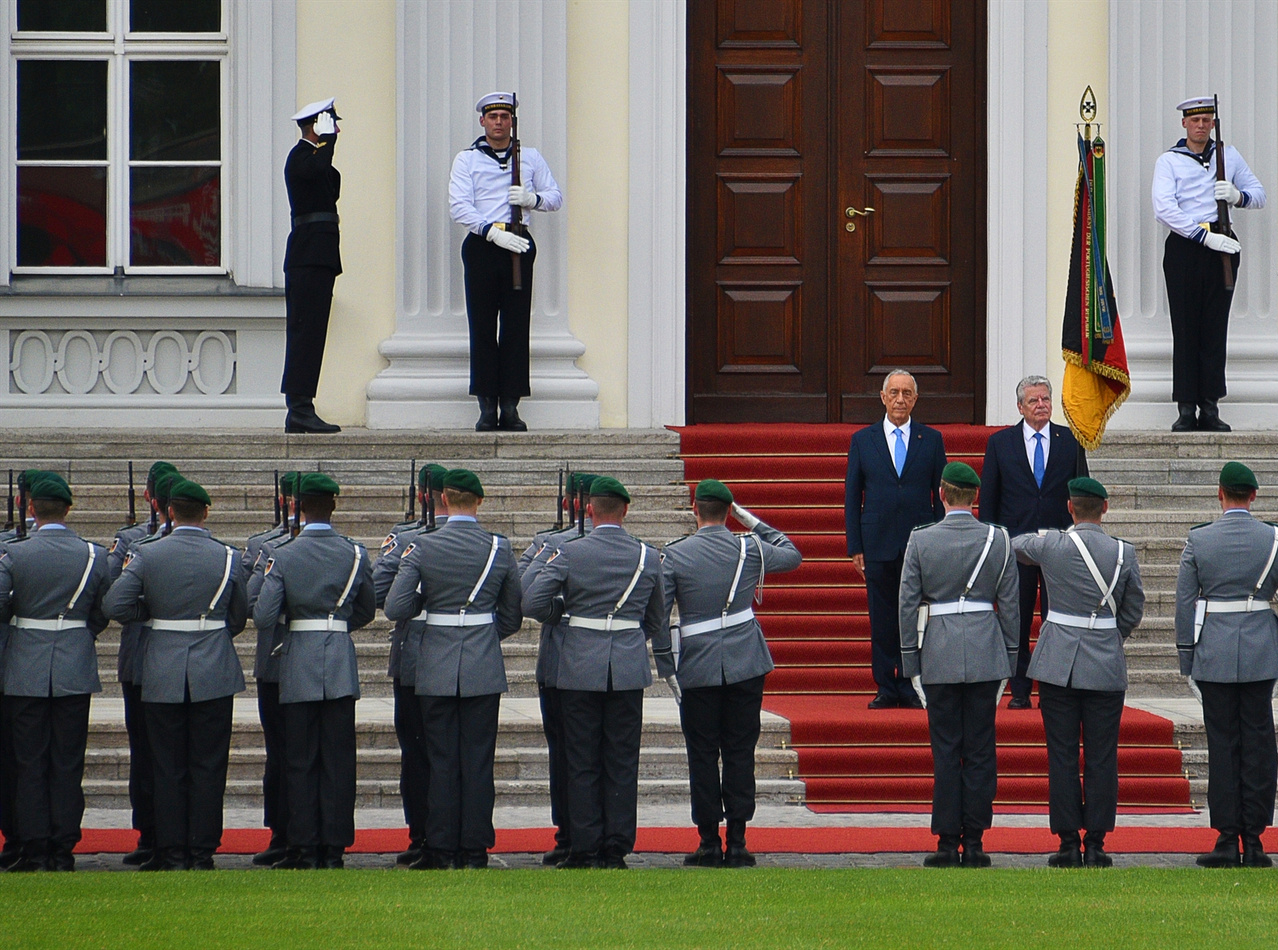
Military reception of Portuguese president Marcelo Rebelo de Sousa by Gauck with the Wachbataillon

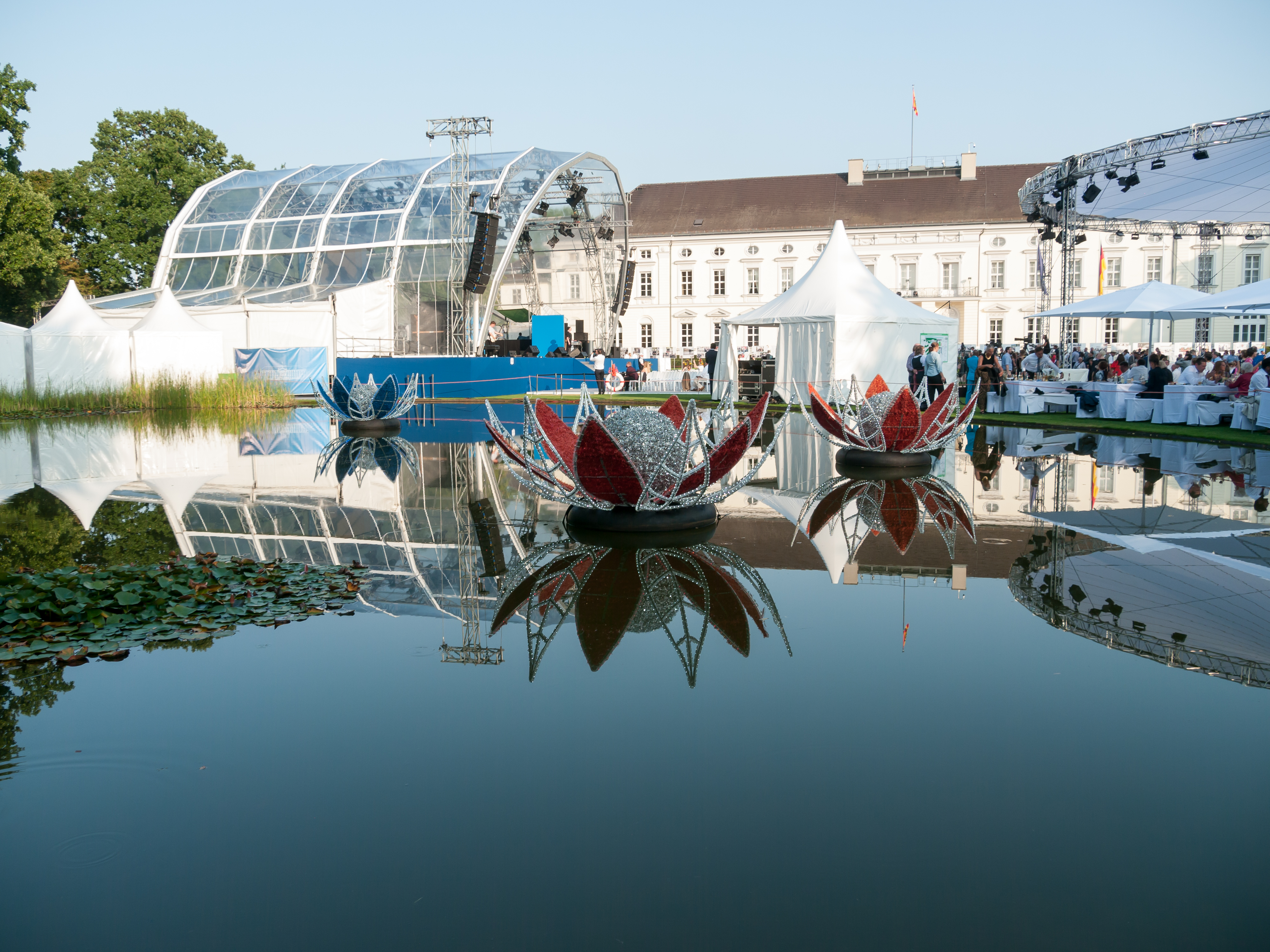
Festival for citizens in the Palace Gardens (2019)

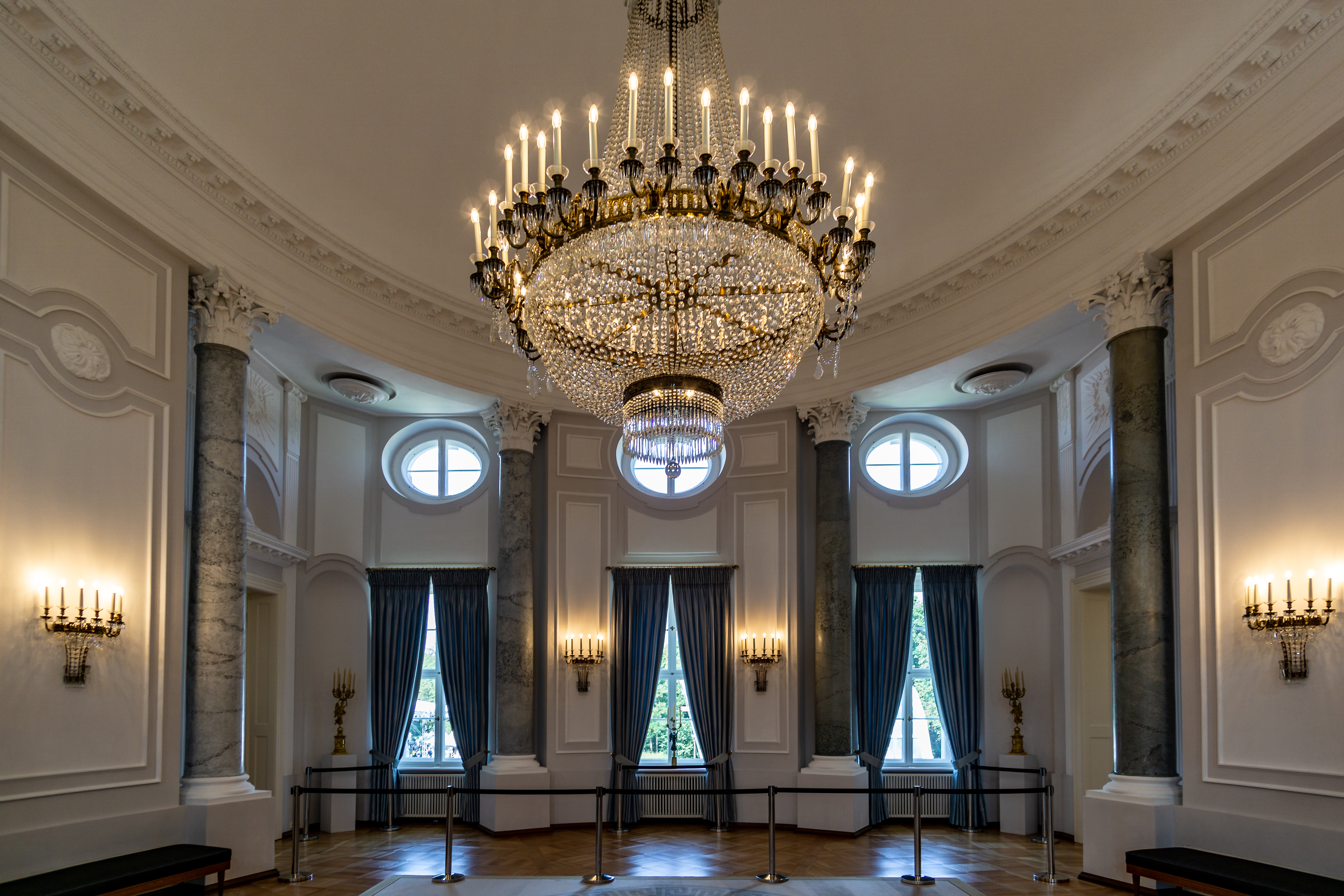
The Oval Ballroom (by C. G. Langhans) on the upper floor

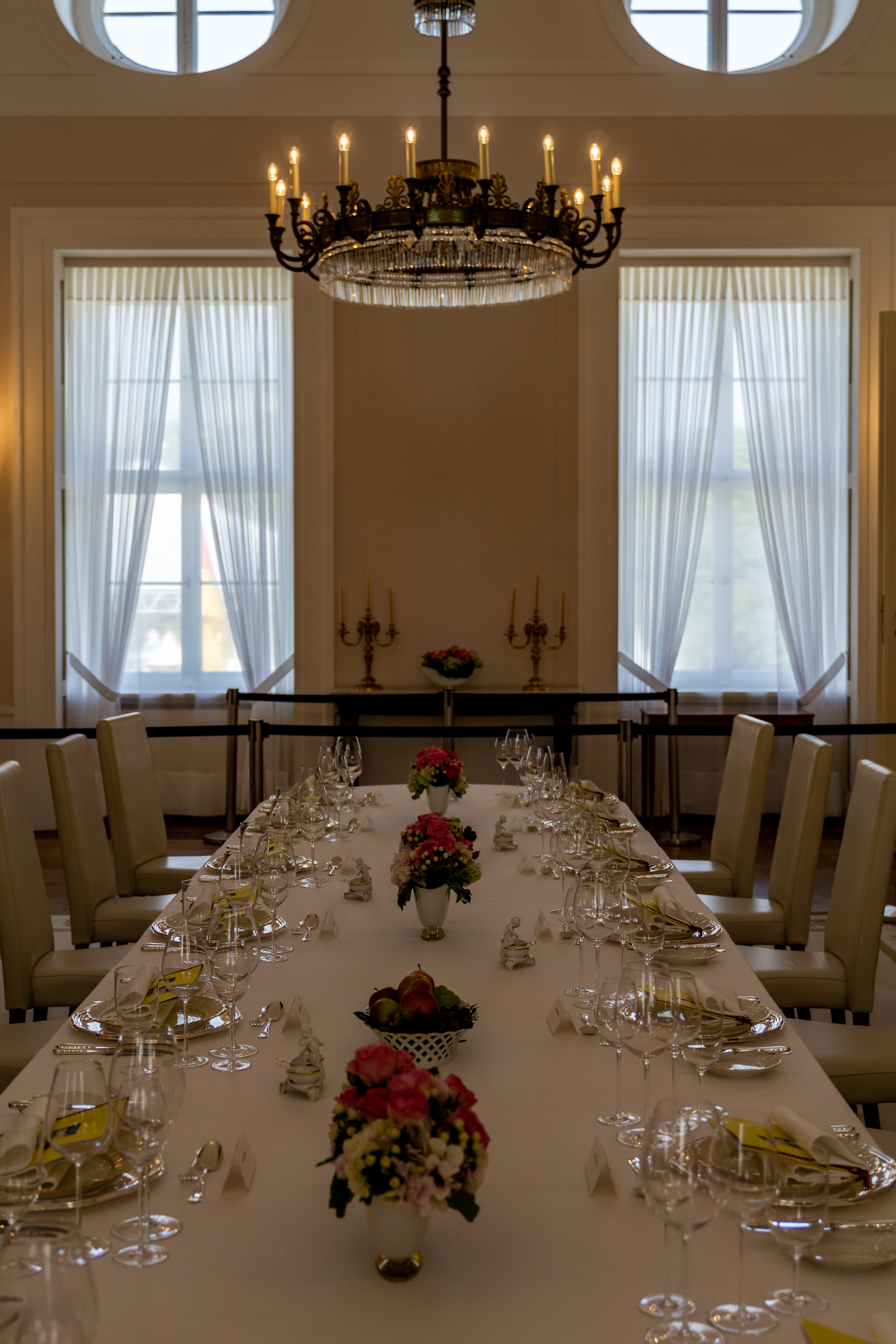
Schinkel-Room

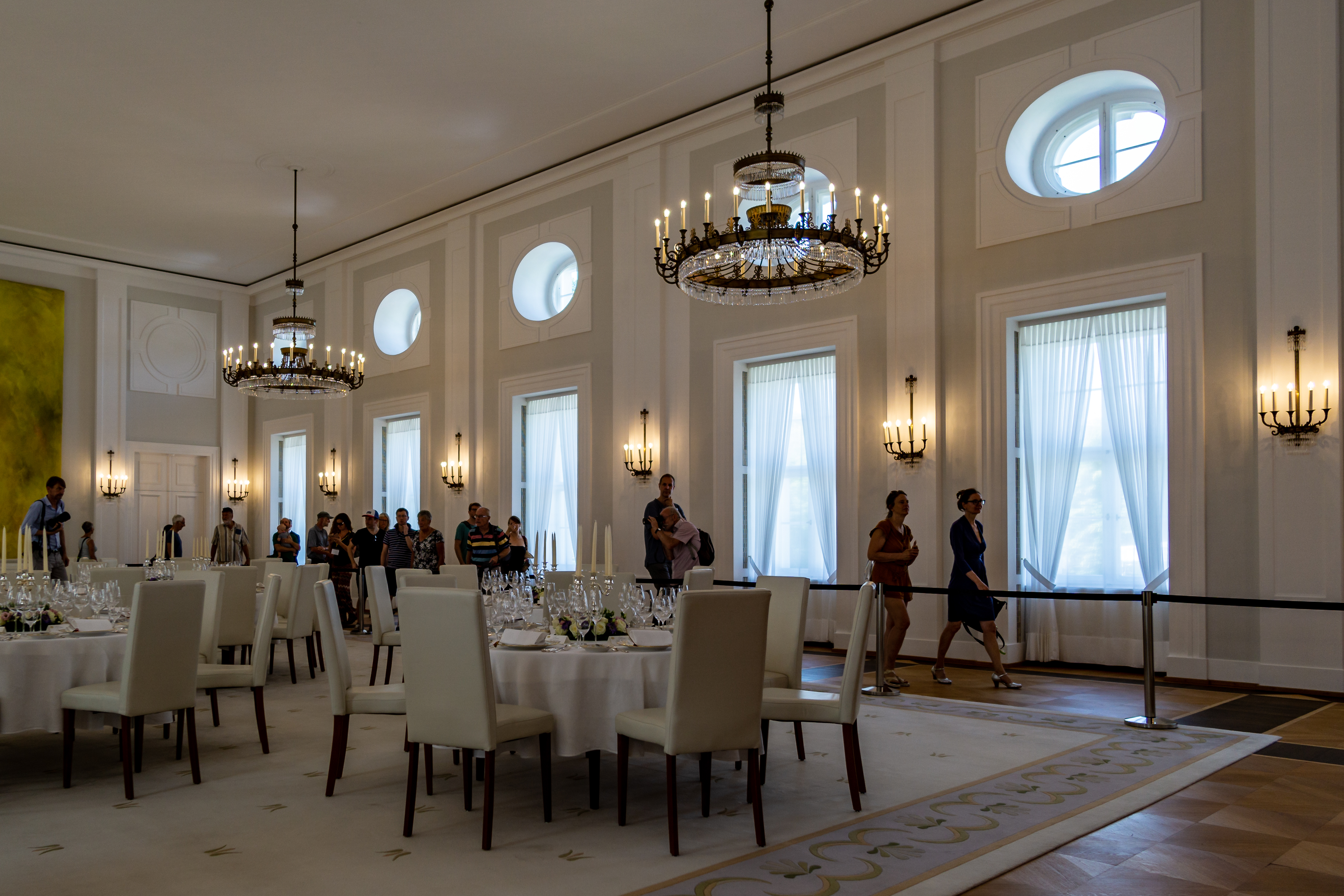
Dinner tables in the Great Hall

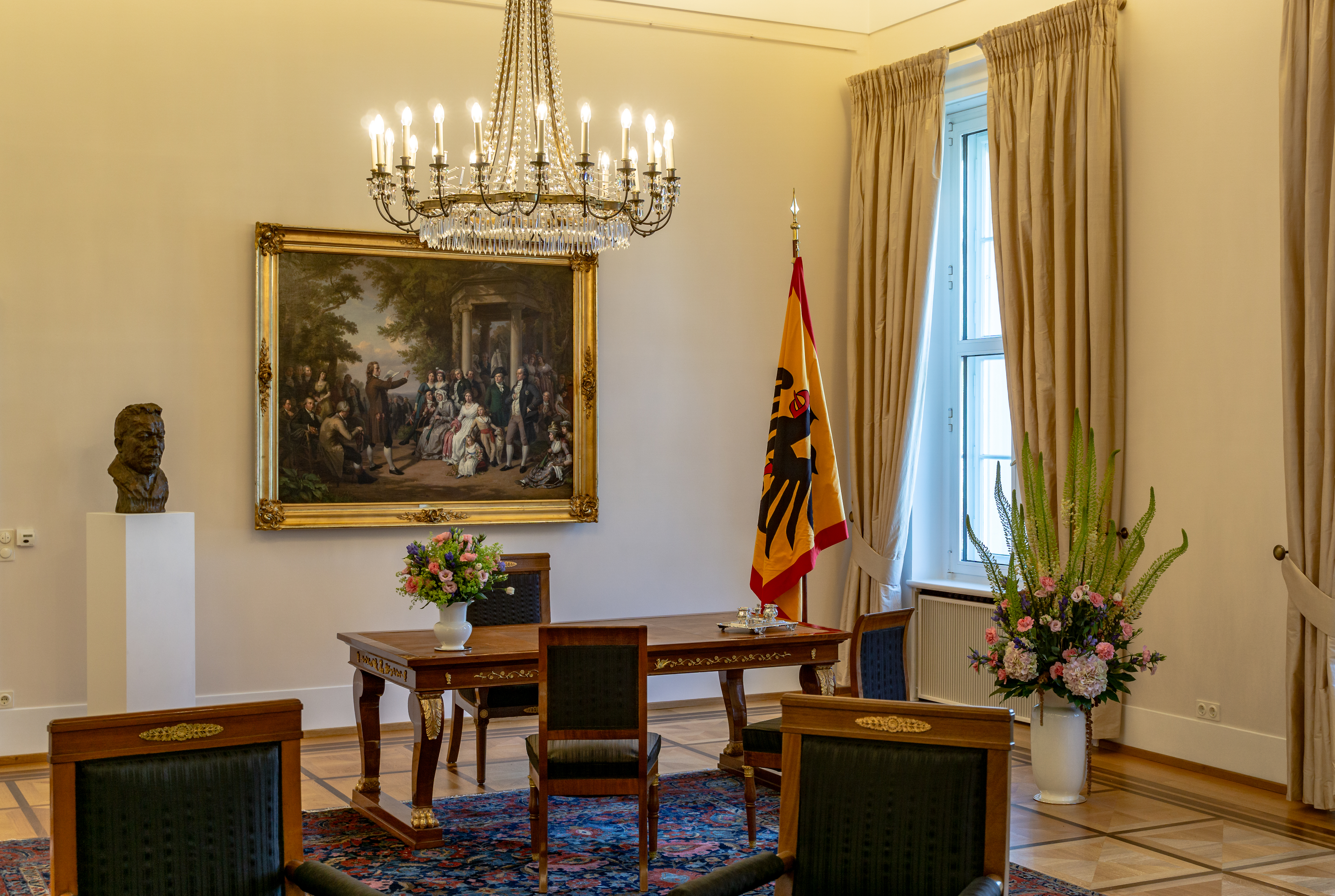
Ceremonial office with bust of Friedrich Ebert, first president of the Weimar Republic, and a painting of the Weimar courtyard of the muses by Theobald von Oer (1860)

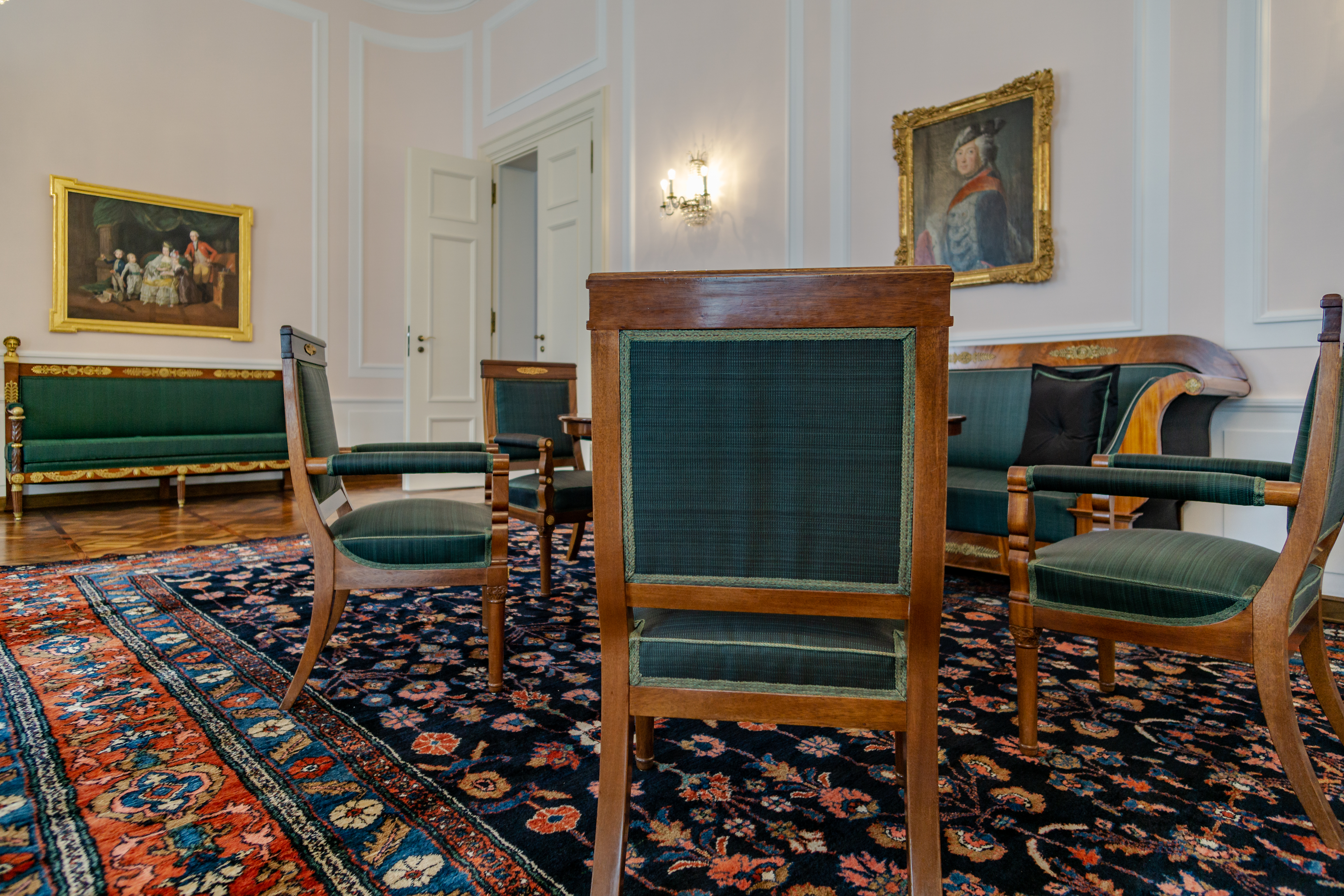
Salon Ferdinand

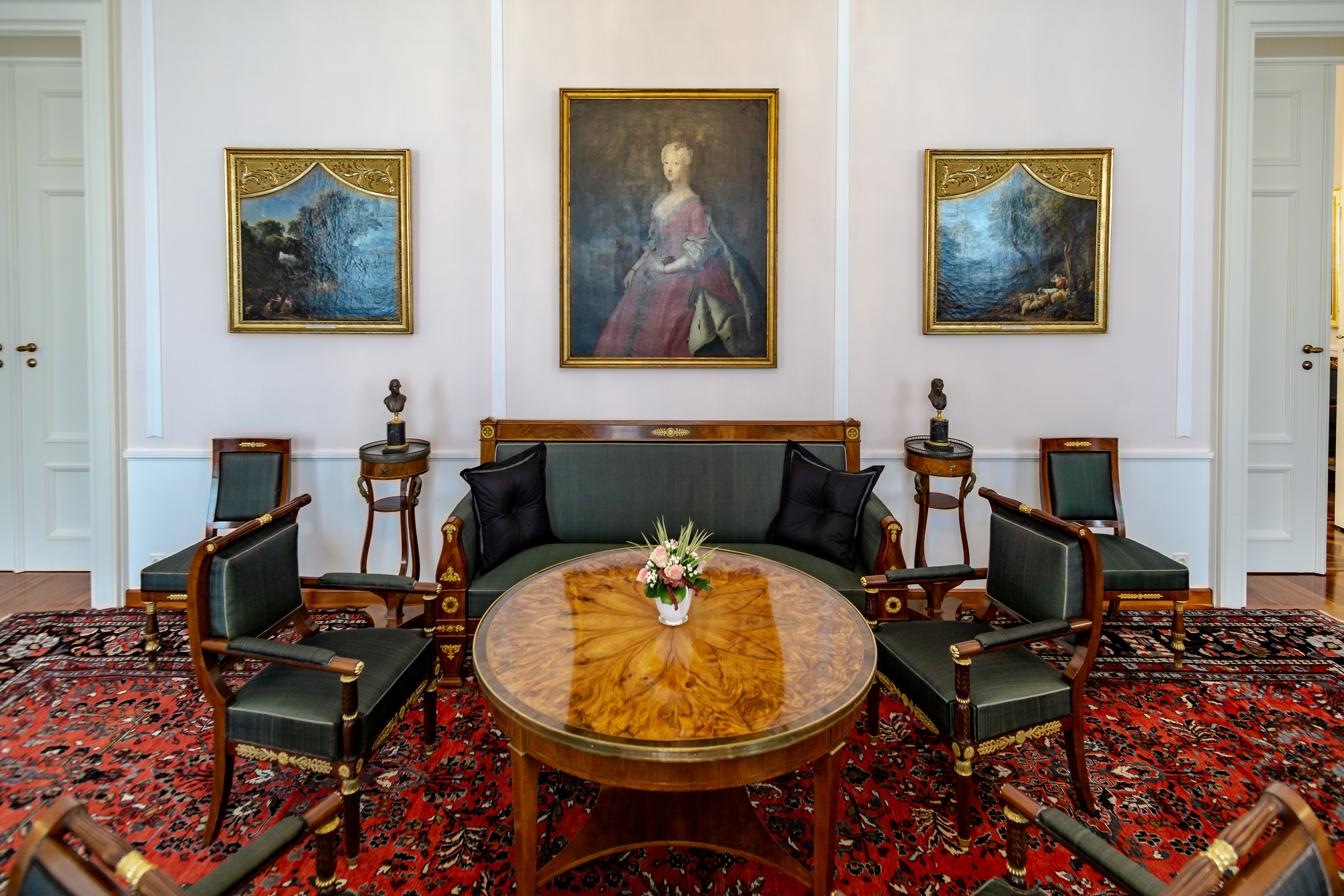
Salon Louise

== See also ==
- German Chancellery
- Berlin Police
- Bellevue Conference (September 11, 1917)
