= Weimar courtyard of the muses =

19th century ideal of Classical Weimar

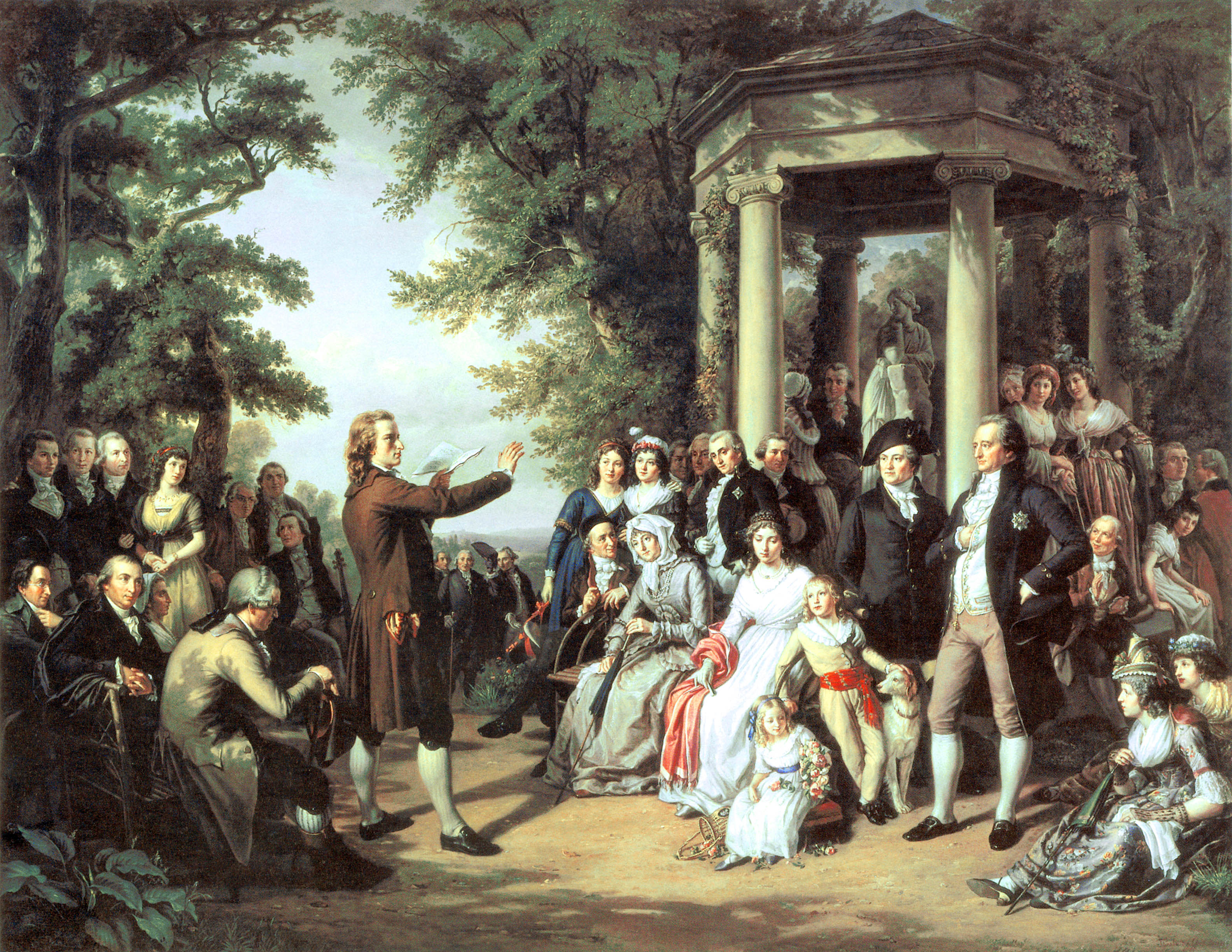
Weimar courtyard of the Muses. Schiller reading to the court in Tiefurt. (1860) by Theobald von Oer. Among the audience are Herder (2. from left, seated), Wieland (center, seated with cap) and Goethe (in front of the pillar, right).

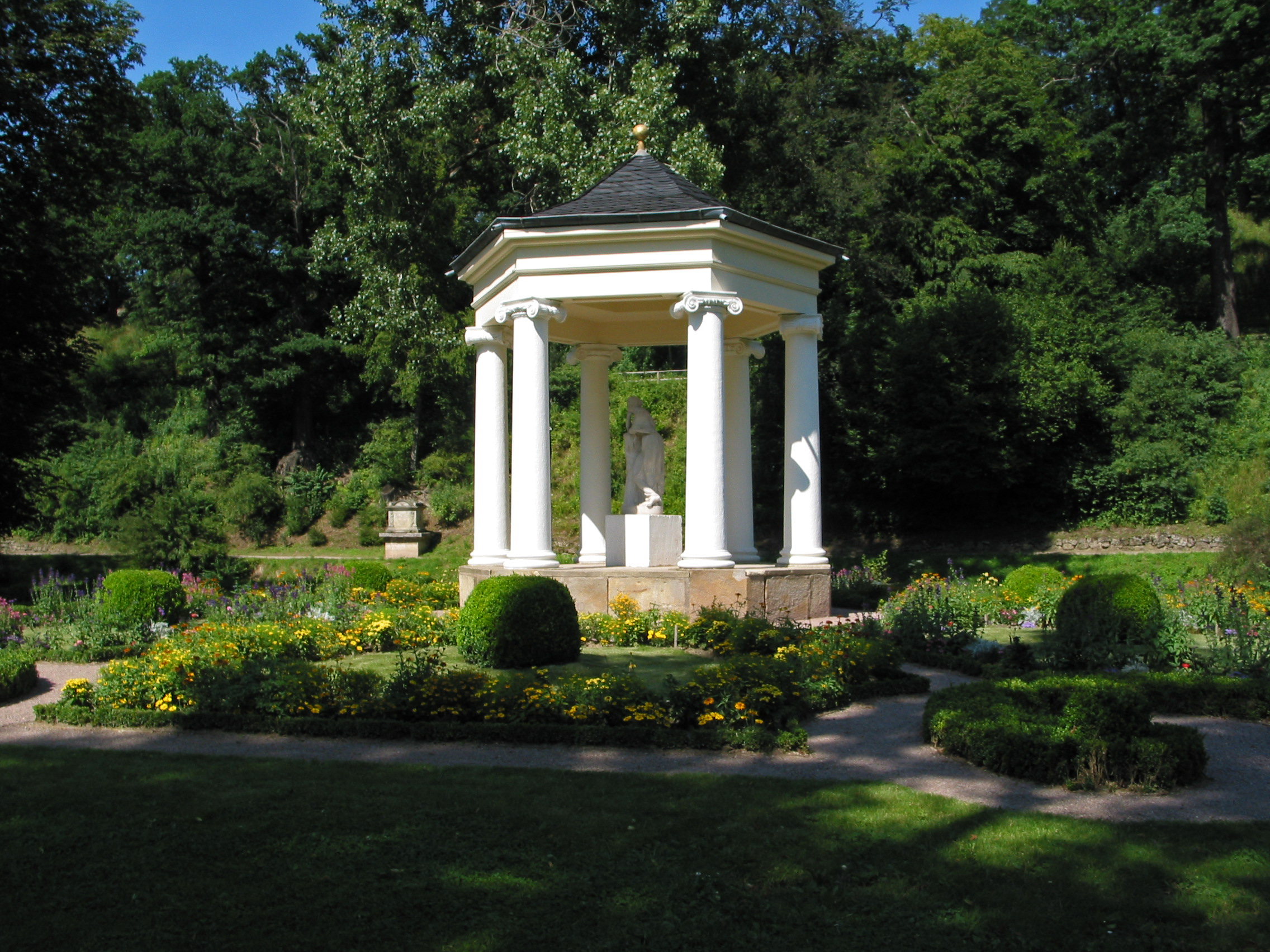
Temple of the Muses with statue of Melpomene, Greek muse of tragic poetry and song, built in 1803, Tiefurt Mansion

The Weimar courtyard of the muses is a term, that had emerged during the 19th century. It refers to an elite fellowship of people in Classical Weimar (1772-1805), that was made up of nobles and commoners, courtiers, civil servants, writers, artists and scientists, who congregated around the central character, Duchess Anna Amalia of Saxe-Weimar-Eisenach, pioneer of Weimar Classicism and patroness of the arts. Duchess Anna Amalia was the mother and from 1758 until 1775 regent for the infant Grand Duke Karl August von Sachsen-Weimar-Eisenach. Among the poets living in Weimar were the most famous German authors of their time, Johann Wolfgang von Goethe, Friedrich Schiller, Christoph Martin Wieland and Johann Gottfried Herder, and the theatre director Abel Seyler as a founding influence.

The concept and character of the courtyard of the muses and Anna Amalias image, role and personal motives have been reviewed and largely "deconstructed" during recent decades. Modern revisions predominantly present sober conclusions and largely disagree with 19th century claims of a society in progress as a result of the utilization of the guiding principles of the Enlightenment and the cultivation of the genius.

== Background ==
Visual inspiration was Theobald von Oer's 1860 painting: Weimar courtyard of the muses. Schiller reading to the court in Tiefurt, in older mentions, also called Weimar's Golden Days. The painting depicts a rather fictional, ideally arranged scene around 1794/95: An illustrious party, that consists of noble members of the court and commoners alike (scholars, artists and scientists), has gathered, regardless to class etiquette and formalities, in and around the Tiefurt Muse temple (which was only built in 1803), while listening to Friedrich Schiller's deliberations. In the creation of a cultivated and witty conviviality, the Duchess was assisted by poet and philosopher Christoph Martin Wieland, who had joined the court as the teacher of the two princes in 1772, being in fact the first of the many famous writers moving to Weimar. Oer's famous painting is presently hanging in the ceremonial office of the President of Germany at Bellevue Palace in Berlin (see image there).

The courtyard of the muses would meet at the ducal Wittumspalais, the rural summer residences in Ettersburg Palace and Park and Tiefurt Manor, debate and discuss books and literature, the latest musical events and plays that had been staged, and contribute to the production of journals and paperbacks in Weimar, Tiefurt and Jena.

== Recent reinterpretation ==
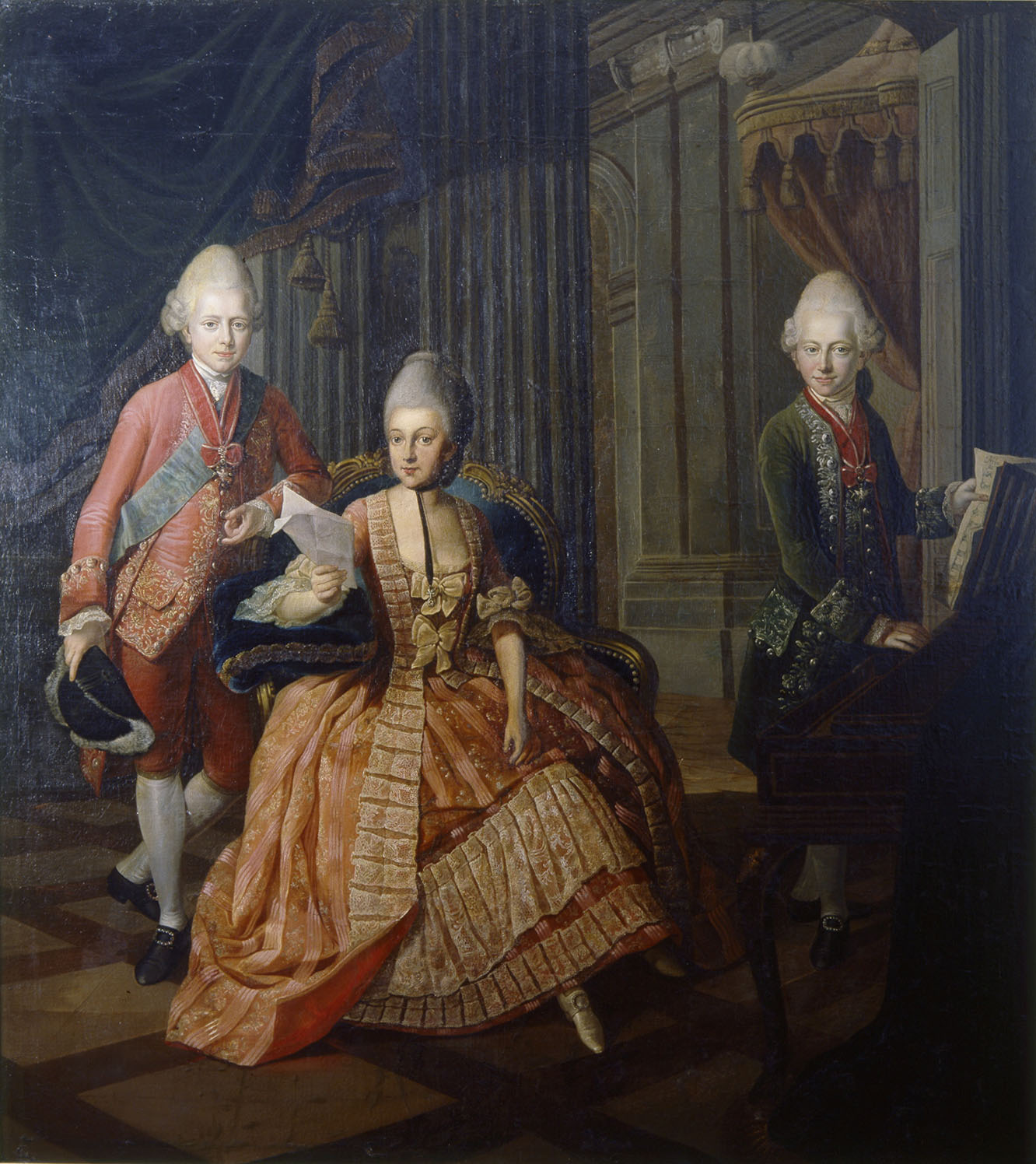
Duchess Anna Amalia of Saxe-Weimar-Eisenach with her sons, around 1773-74

Not until the late 20th century had this idea of a Weimar courtyard of the muses been contested and dismissed as pseudoscientific 19th century legend formation and romanticism. Contemporary sources of the Classical Weimar court never referred to a courtyard of the muses and Duchess Anna Amalia is not known to have at any time discontinued standard court ceremony or contested common class regulations. Her role as pioneer of Weimar Classicism has been challenged by author J. Berger, as he points out that the duchess has given the primacy of the arts not to literature but to music. Berger also exhorts, that she does not qualify as a true patroness of the arts because she refused unconditional promotion of free artists, but treated them as civil servants who were obliged to perform certain tasks.

However, according to author J. H. Ulbricht, all these scientific disenchantments have failed to notably penetrate the communicative and cultural memory of the public. The narrative of the historiographically colorful idyll of Classical Weimar begins with Anna Amalias death and continues to be told until 1993. Already in 1807, shortly after her burial, Goethe sought the opportunity to advertise Weimar's cultural prowess via the Duchess' obituary, that he published in a series of journals. The second volume of a 1908 trilogy on the life of Anna Amalia is titled: Duchess Amalies Courtyard of the Muses and has been published repeatedly under this name.

In 1844 the academic historian Wilhelm Wachsmuth published a historical sketch in which the term courtyard of the muses was used for the first time in a scholarly context, steadily spread for decades and solidified into a formula. Eventually, in a 1993 typology attempt the term courtyard of the muses was determined as one of five types of European courts and Weimar was referred to as the courtyard of the muses par excellence.

== See also ==
- Tiefurt House

== Bibliography ==
- Leonie und Joachim Berger: Anna Amalia von Weimar. Eine Biographie C. H. Beck Publishing, Munich 2006
- Alison Cole: Italian Renaissance Courts, London 2016, Laurence King Publishing Ltd
- Claudia Brink: Arte et Marte. Kriegskunst und Kunstliebe im Herrscherbild des 15. und 16. Jahrhunderts in Italien, Munich, Berlin 2001.
- Heide Schulz: Weimars schönster Stern. Anna Amalia von Sachsen-Weimar und Eisenach. Quellentexte zum Entstehen einer Ikone, Heidelberg 2011, ISBN 978-3-8253-5887-7
