= Tiefurt House =

Coordinates: 50°59′38″N 11°21′49″E

UNESCO World Heritage Site
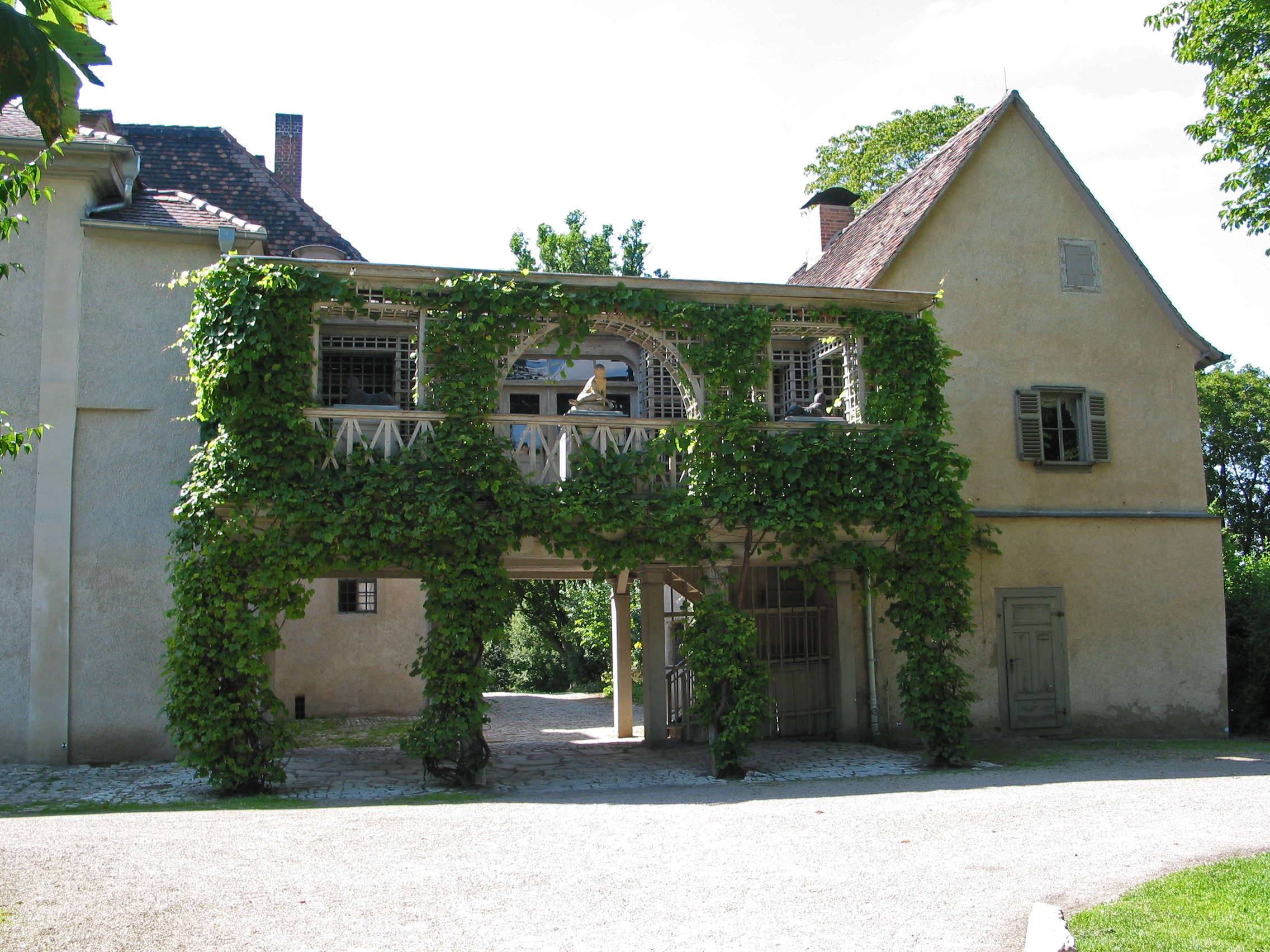
- Main entrance to the Schlosshof
- Interactive map of Tiefurt House
- Location: Weimar, Germany
- Part of: Classical Weimar
- Criteria: Cultural: (iii), (vi)
- Reference: 846
- Inscription: 1998 (22nd Session)

Tiefurt House (German: Schloss Tiefurt) is a small stately home on the Ilm river in the Tiefurt quarter of Weimar, about 4 km east of the city centre. It was the summer residence of duchess Anna Amalia of Brunswick-Wolfenbüttel. Because of its importance as a centre of culture during the Weimar Classicism movement of the late 18th and early 19th centuries, the Tiefurt House was inscribed on the UNESCO World Heritage List in 1998 as part of the Classical Weimar site.

== History ==
The house originated at the end of the 16th century as the tenant's house (Pächterhaus) of a ducal estate (Kammergut), and was converted and extended in 1765. It consists of a main building, with an upper floor of 7 rooms, and a smaller auxiliary building connected to it. Charles Augustus granted it to his brother Constantine for his own court, under Constantine's tutor Karl Ludwig von Knebel in 1776. Four years later their mother selected it as her summer seat during a long absence of the prince. She and her two servants occupied the upper floor, with her courtier, Luise von Göchhausen, in the auxiliary building. For around 25 years the castle was Anna Amalia's favourite residence and the centre of a circle of poets, as part of Weimar Classicism.

On the duchess's death in 1807 the building became neglected, though Charles Augustus's son Charles Frederick began renovation work within Goethe's lifetime. In 1907 it opened to the public as a museum, and from 1978 to 1981 it was restored to its 1800 decor, with the sequence of rooms restored to that of Anna Amalia's time.

Schloss Tiefurt

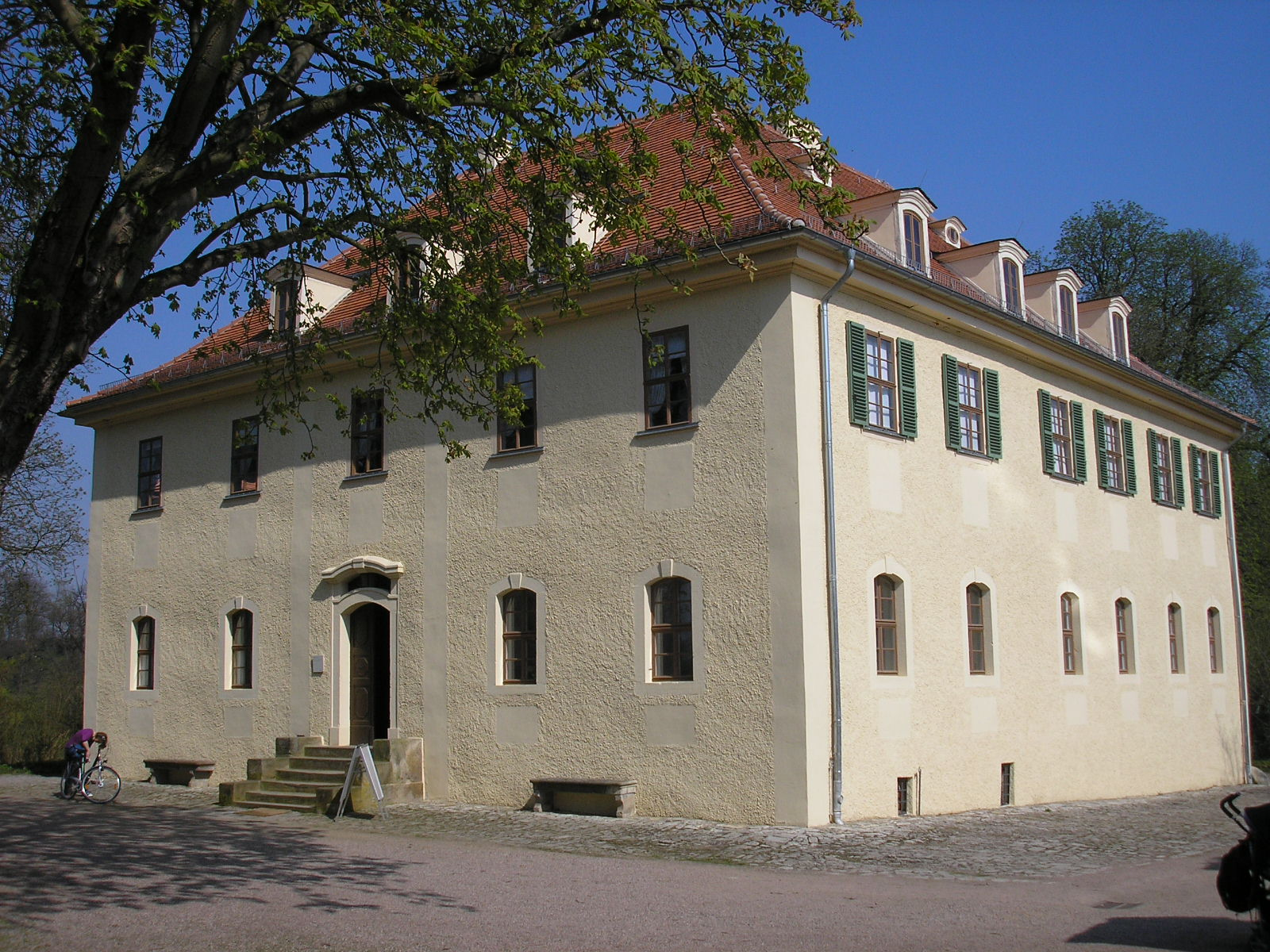
Southwest view of the house

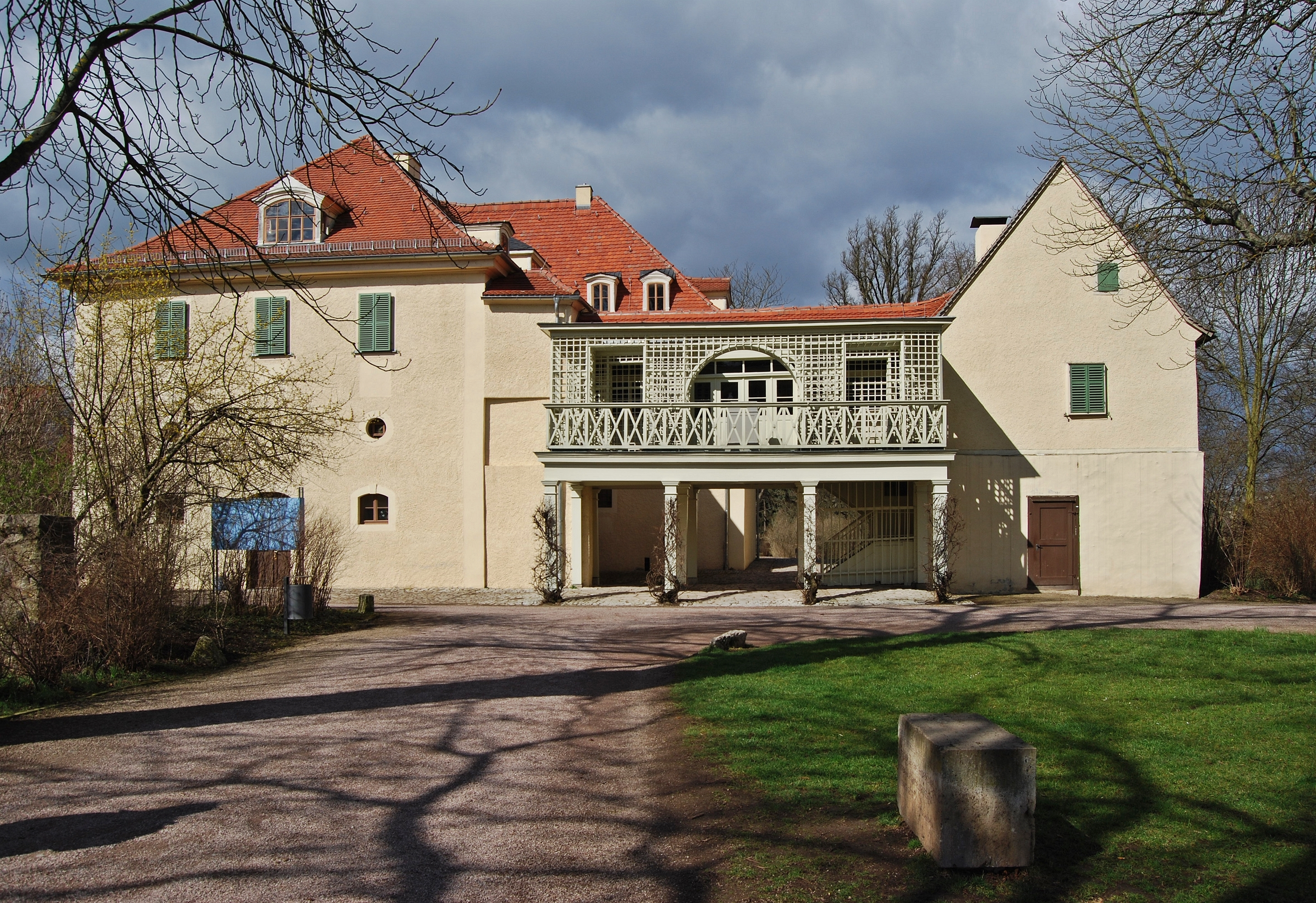
Rear view

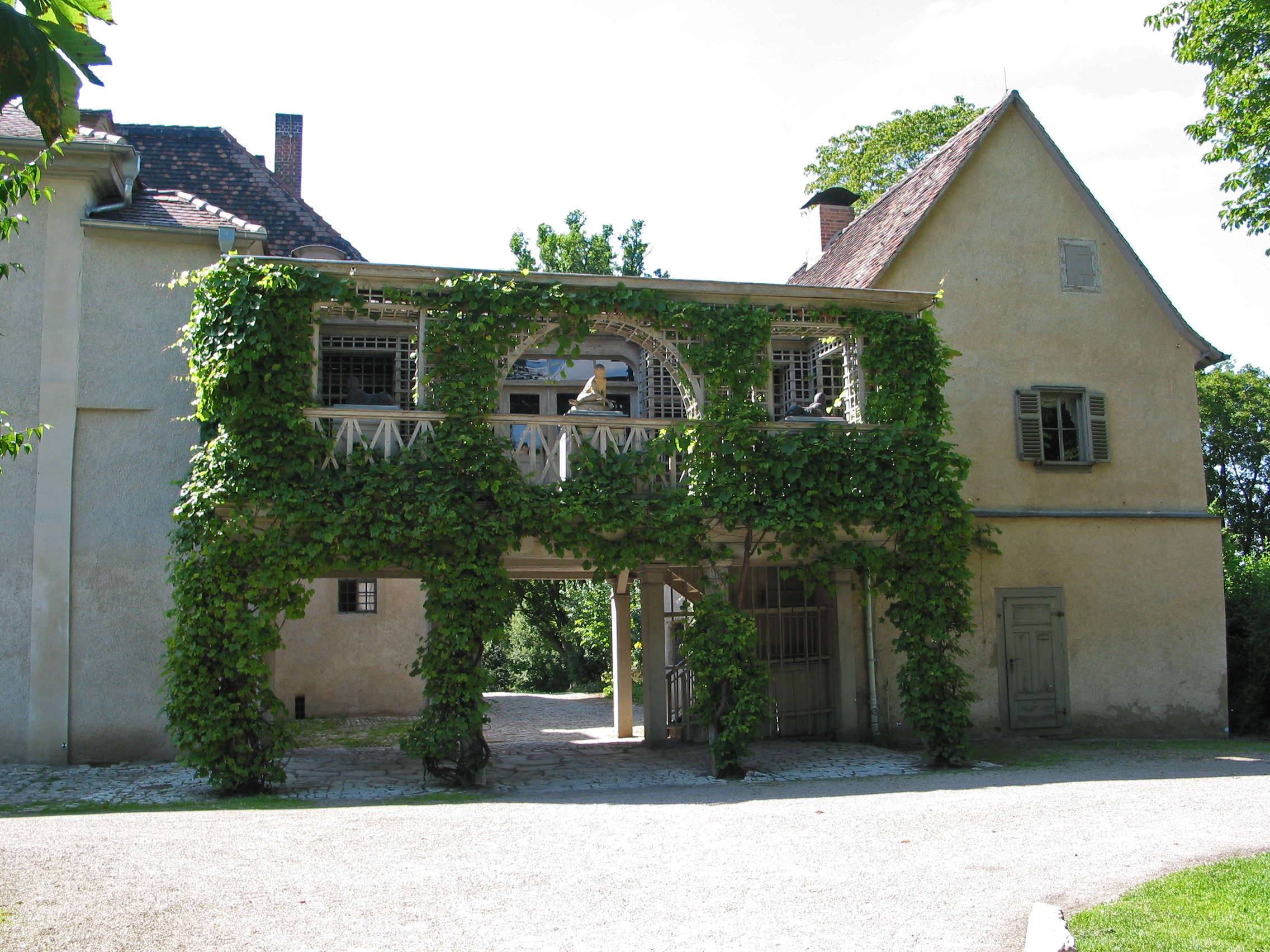
Green portal to the courtyard
Interior

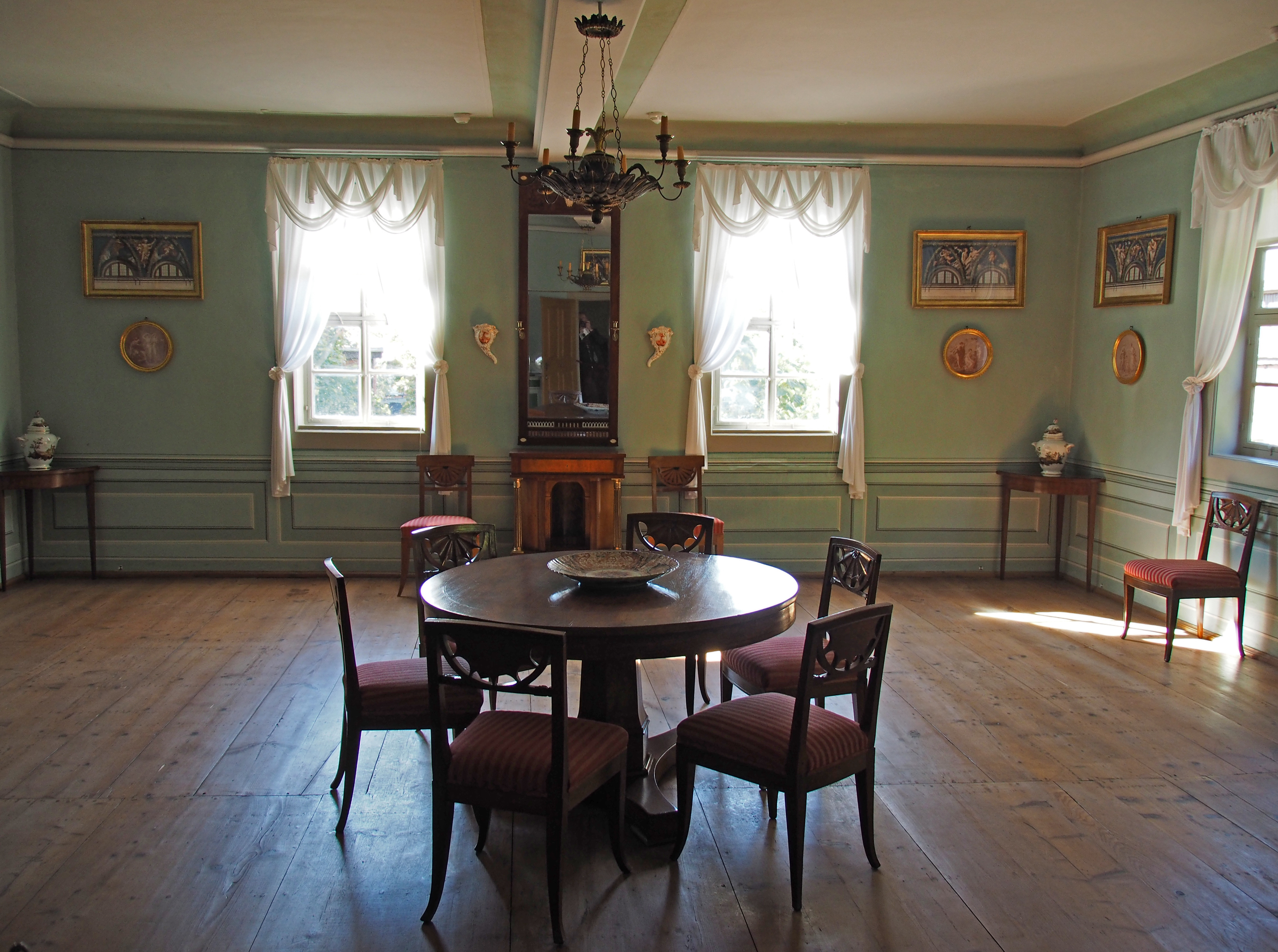

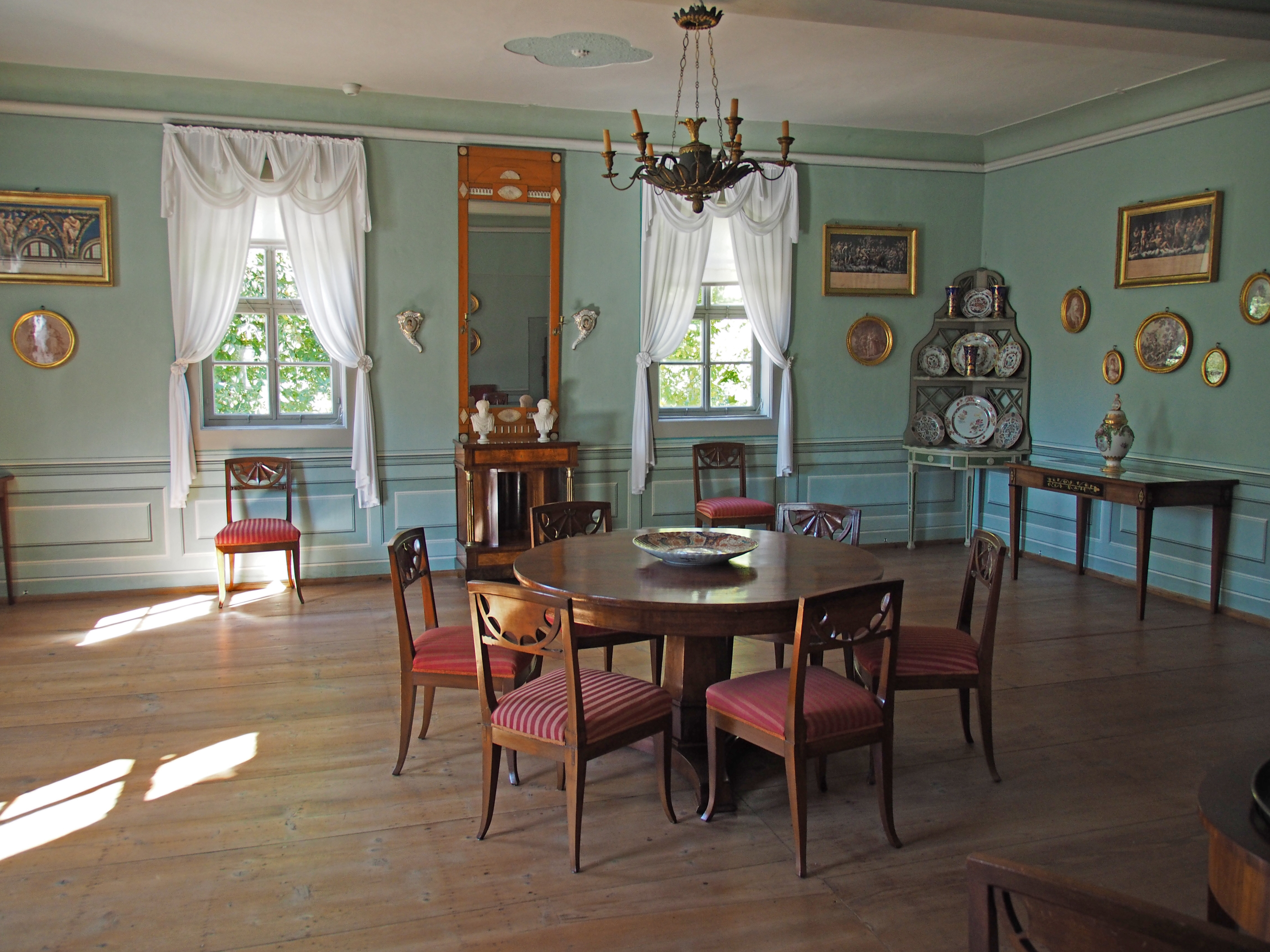

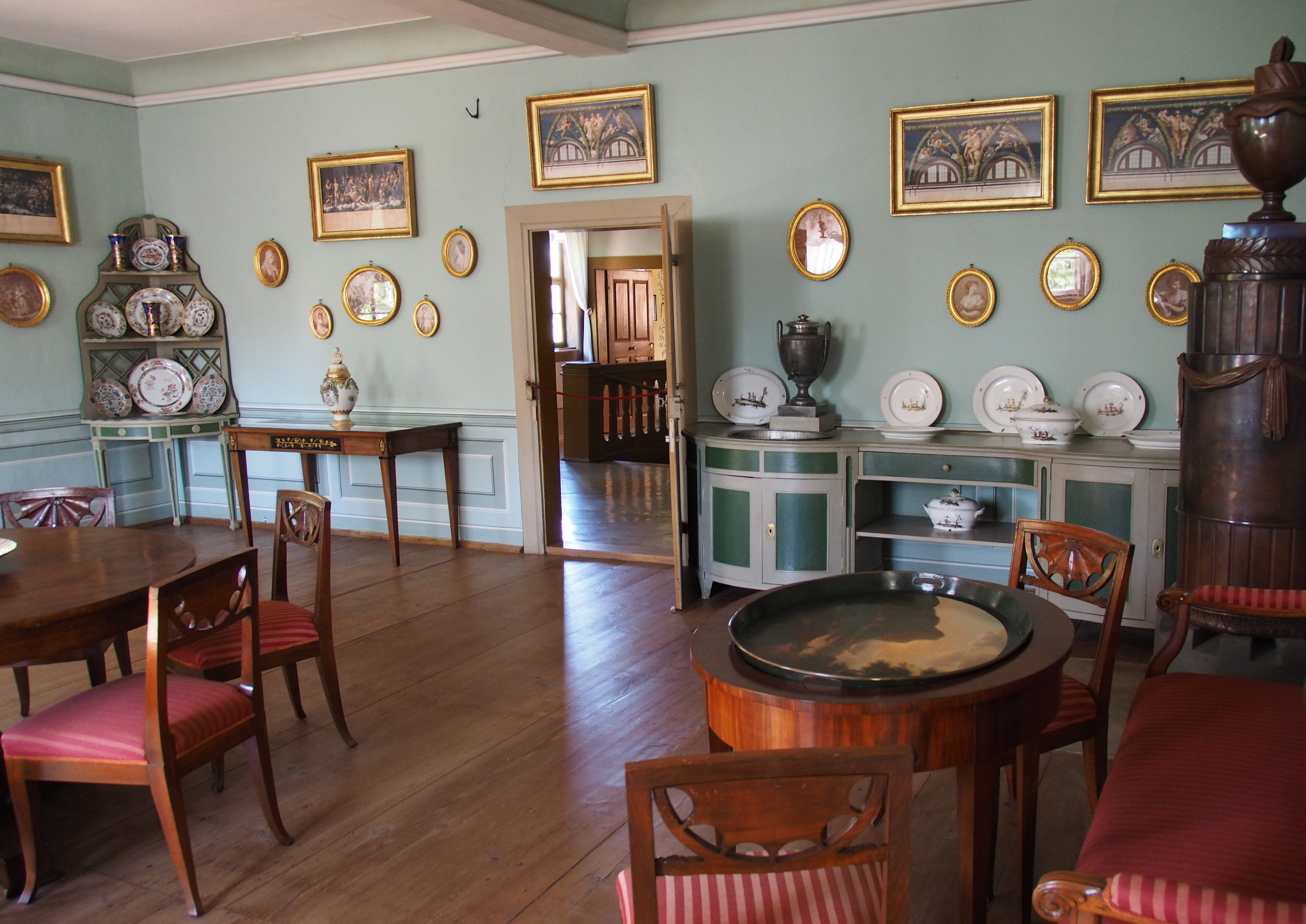

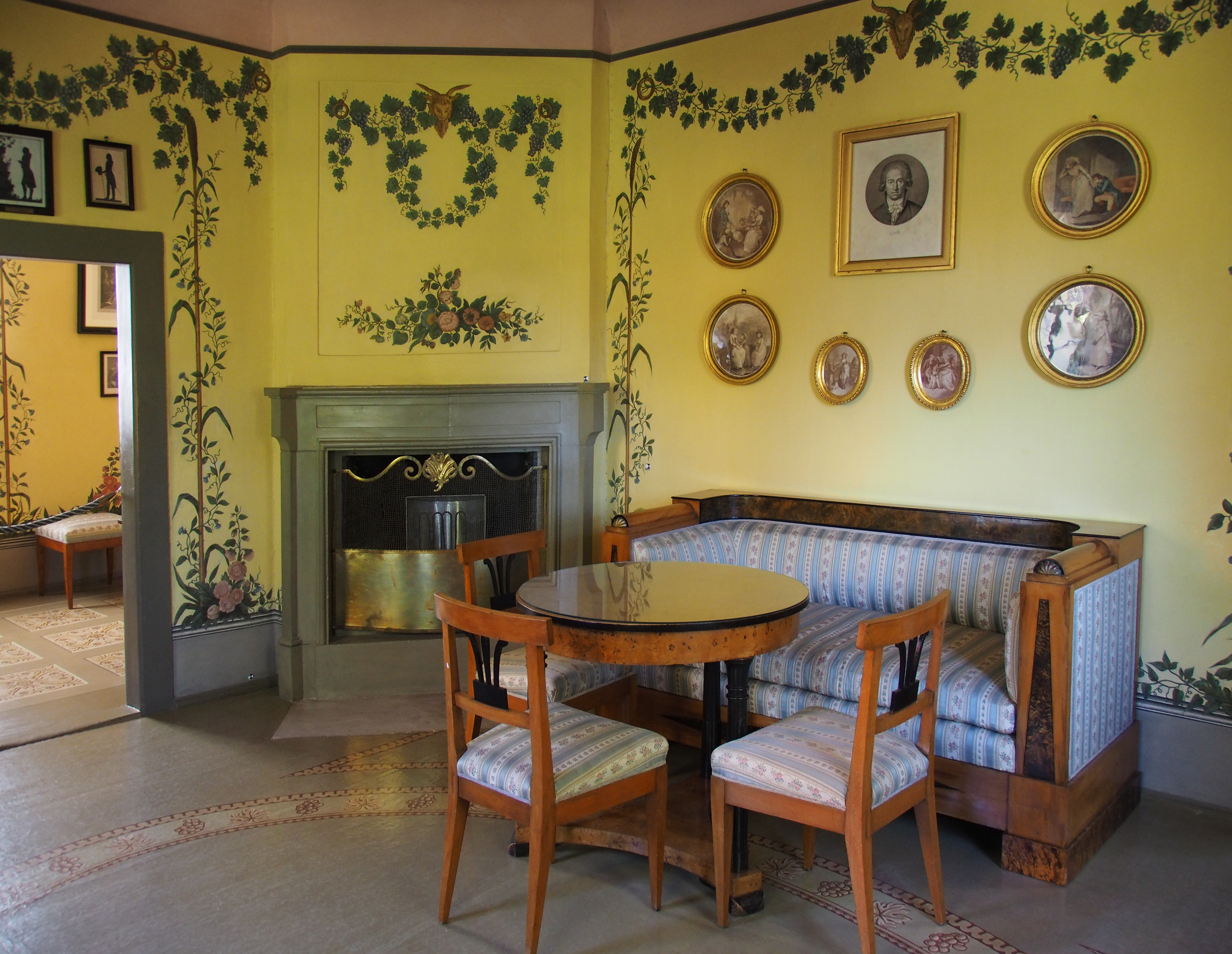

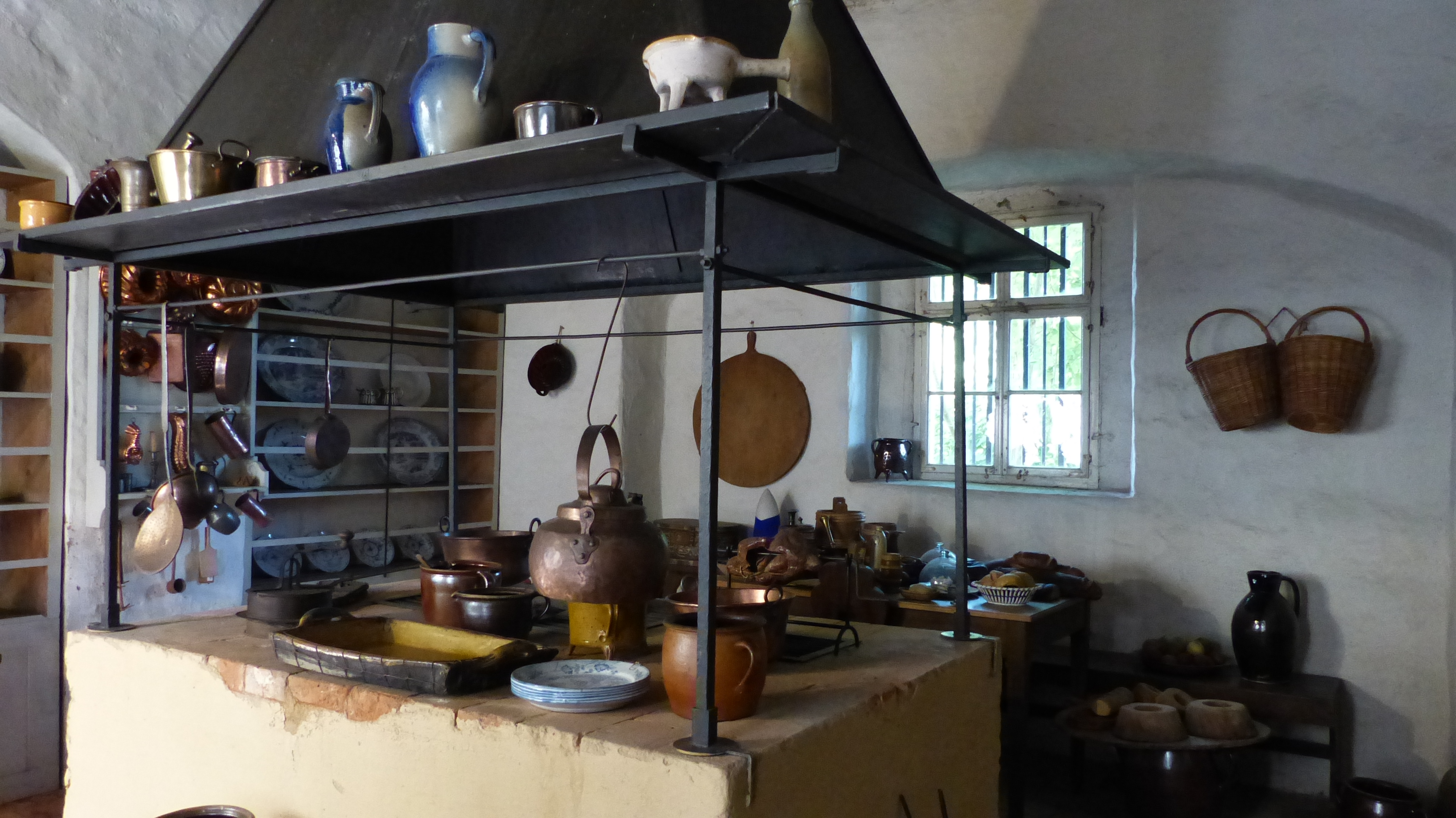
Kitchen

== Park ==
On the nearby meadow was a landscape garden in the English style, also open to the public. Schiller is buried in the grand-ducal burial chamber in the grounds. The well-known landscape gardener Eduard Petzold was put in charge of the gardens during the 19th-century renovations.

Garden

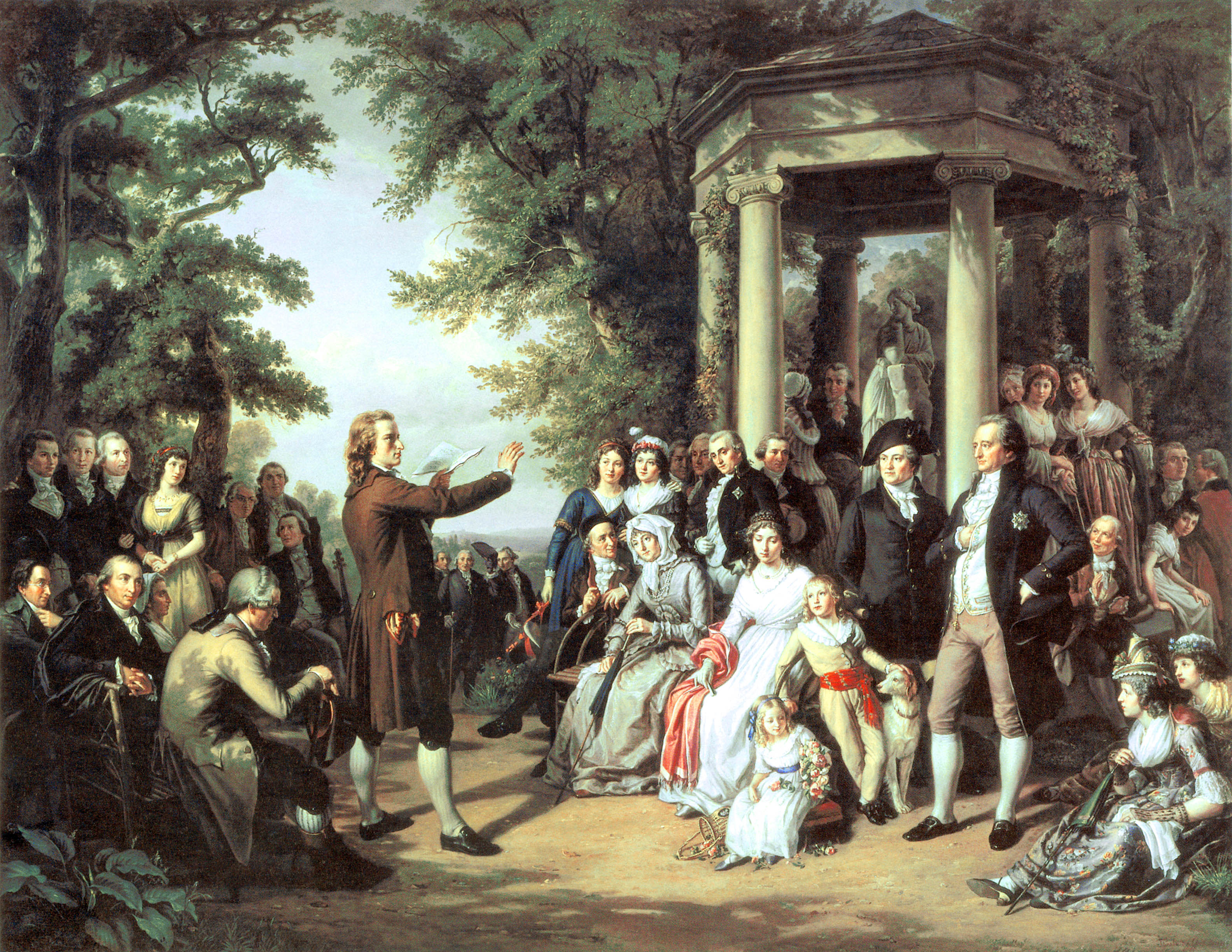
Der Weimarer Musenhof - a scene in the castle gardens.

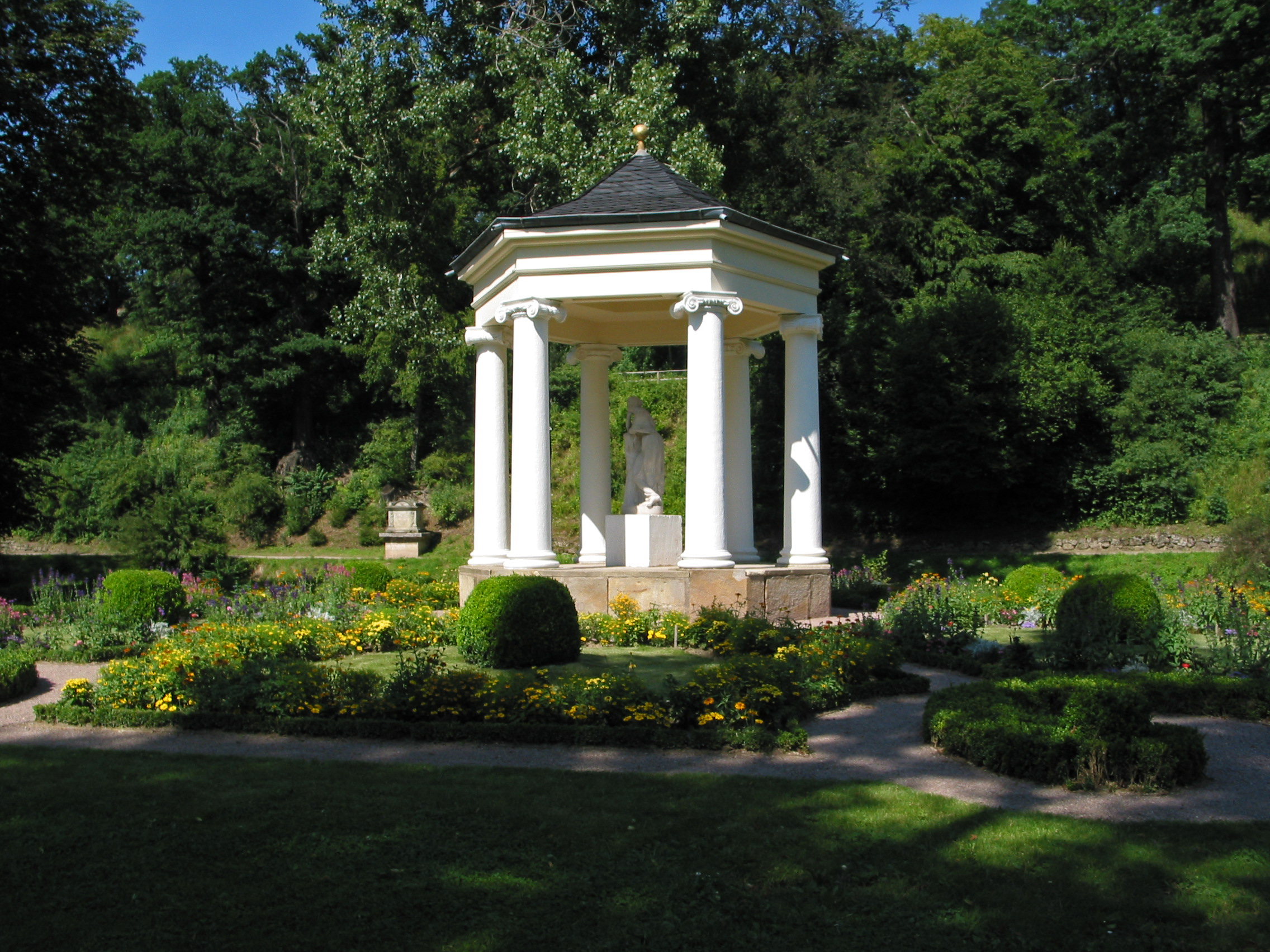
Temple to the Muses, with a sculpture of Polyhymnia, 1803

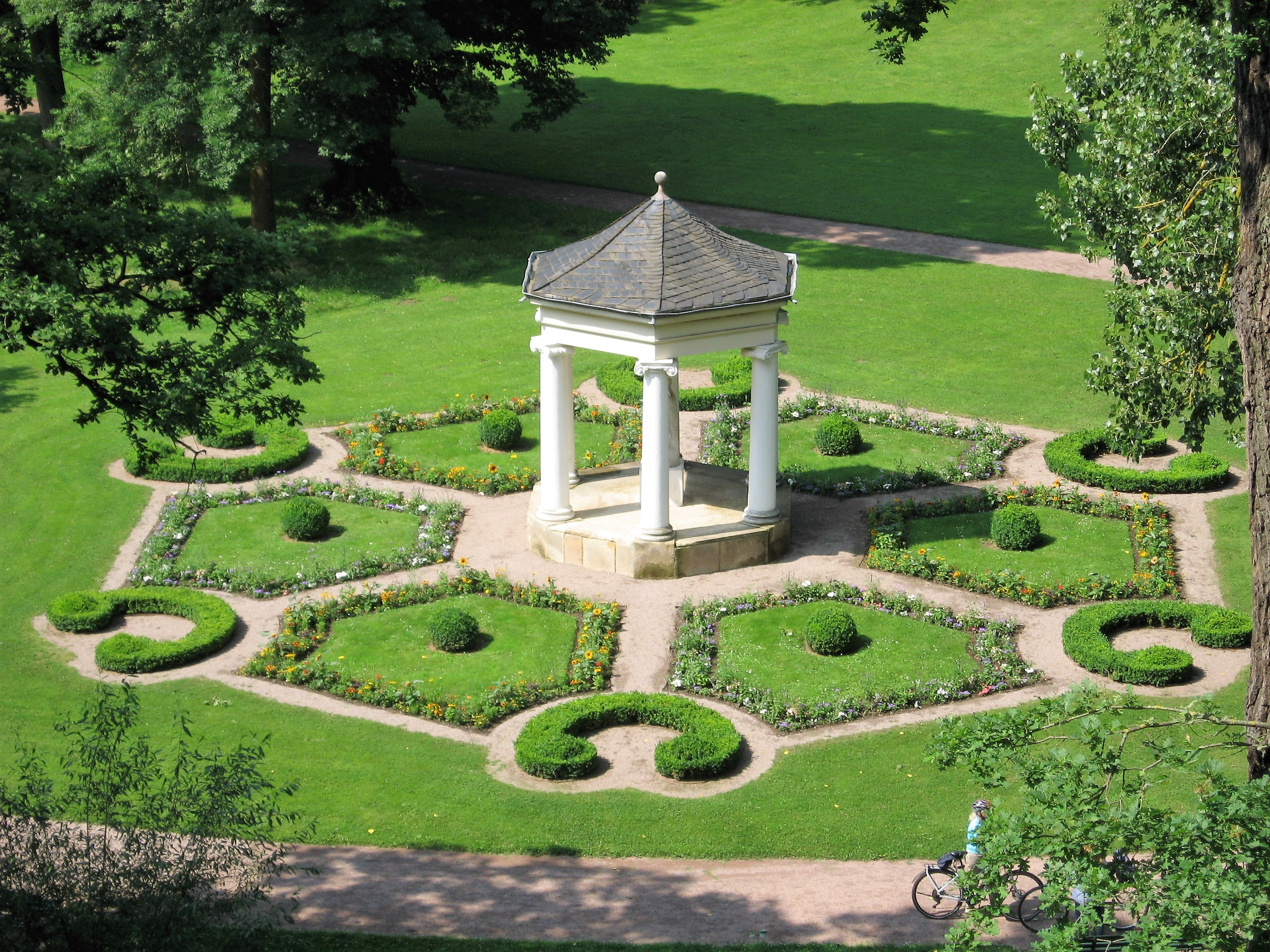
Temple

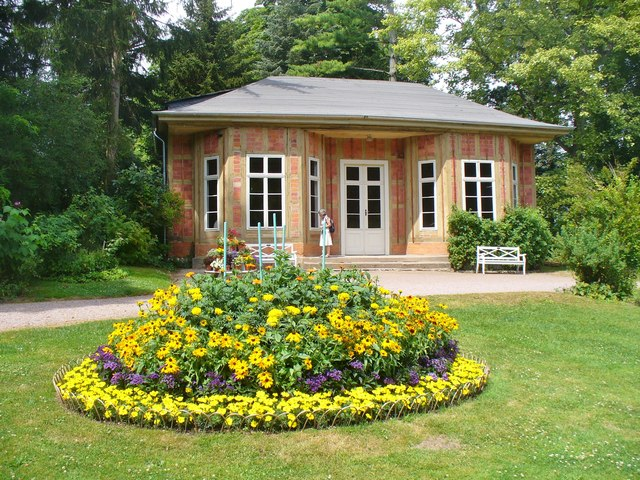
Tea house

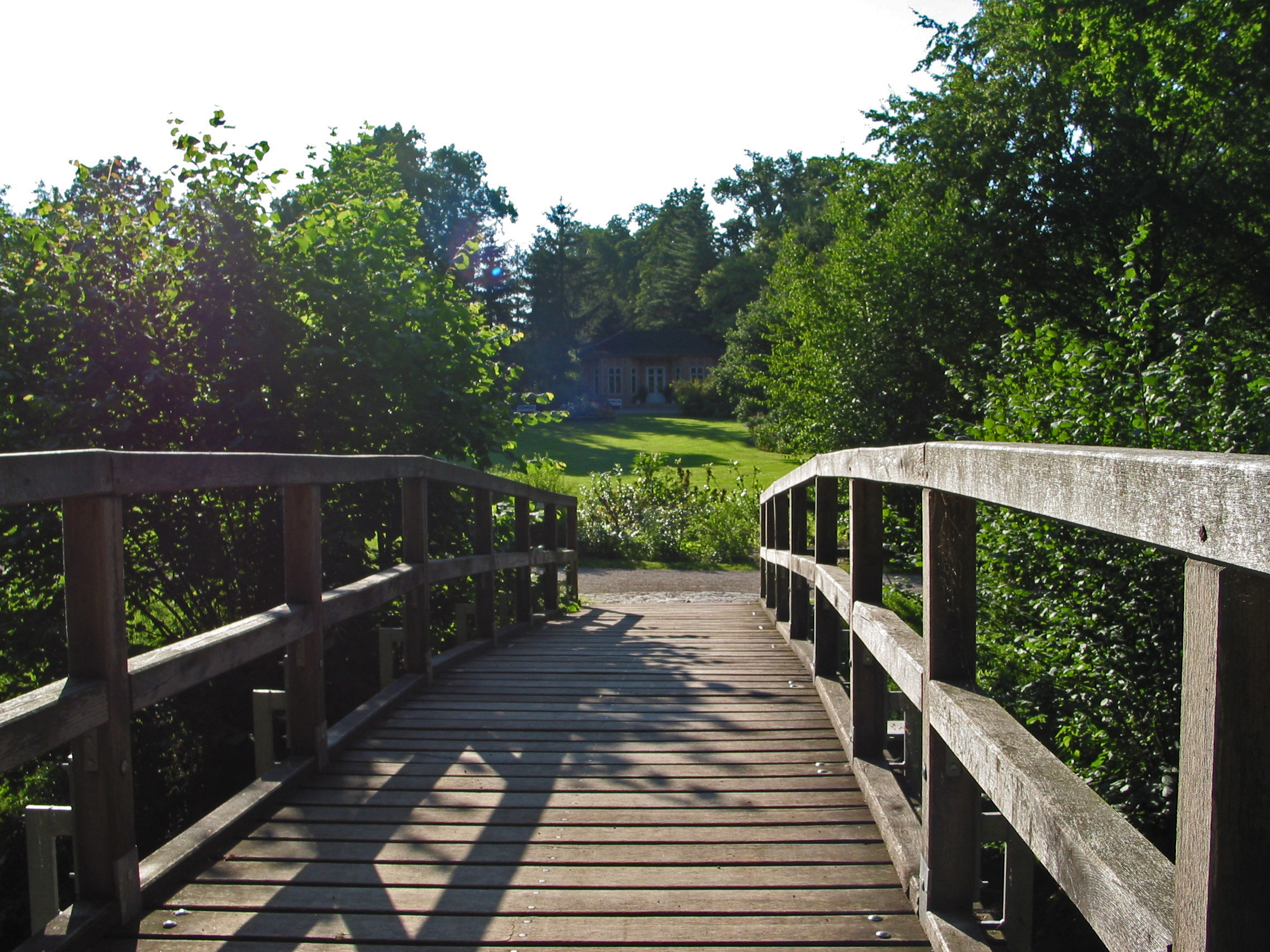
The "Yellow Bridge" over the Ilm looking towards the teahouse in the 21 hectare castle park.

== See also ==
- Weimar courtyard of the muses
