= Maximilian Joseph Franz of Oer =

German author and baron

Maximilian Joseph Franz of Oer (1806–1846) was a German writer and baron. He was the older brother of the notable artist Theobald von Oer.
