= Theobald von Oer =

German painter

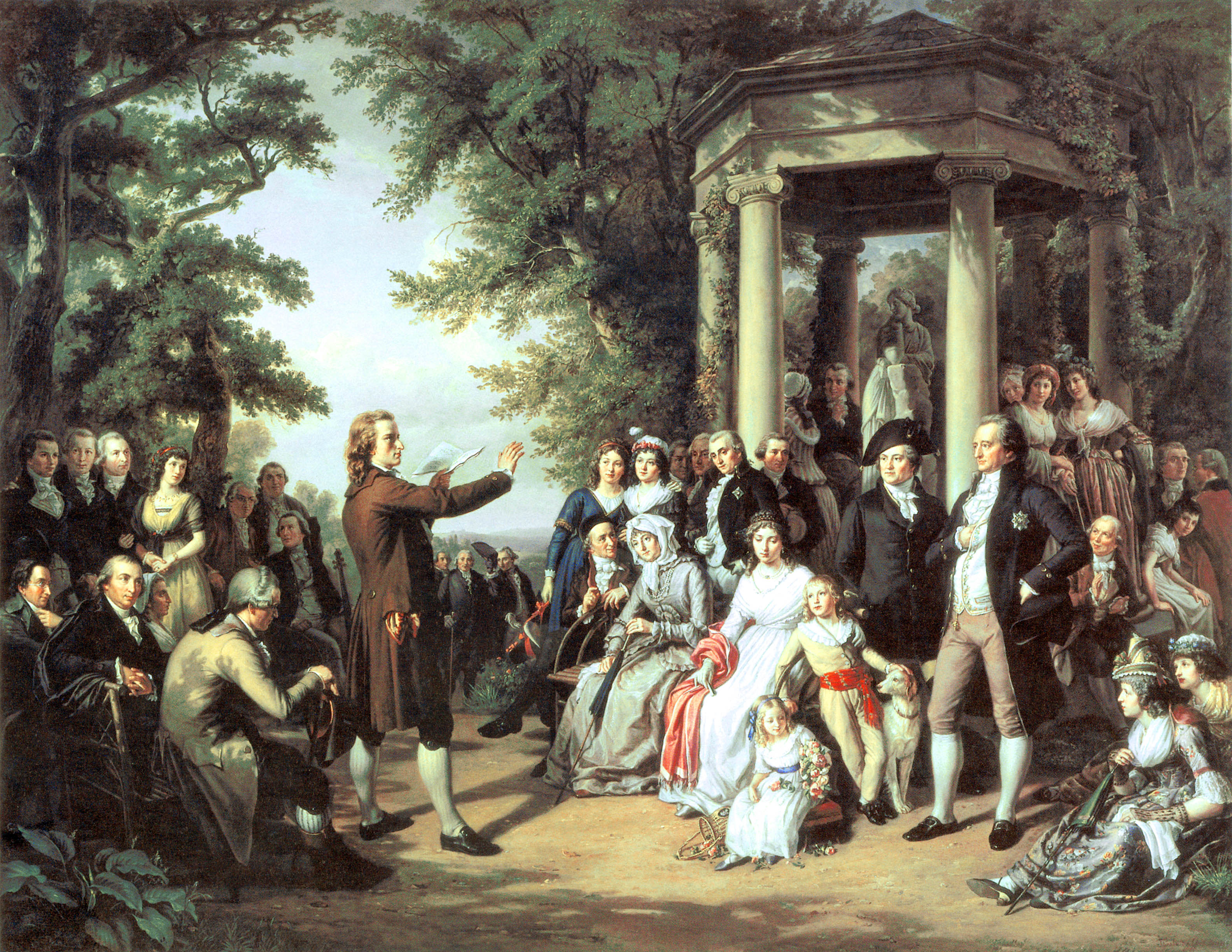
Theobald von Oer (1807–1885): The Weimar Court of the Muses. - In 1860, 55 years after Schiller's death in 1805, this oil painting was produced of a reading of his poems in the park of the Schloss Tiefurt. Among the listeners, to the right, is Goethe.

Theobald Reinhold Freiherr von Oer (9 October 1807 – 1885) was a German painter, illustrator and etcher. He is notable for his portraits, genre paintings and historic paintings. He is associated with the Düsseldorf school of painting.

== Early life ==
Theobald von Oer, born at Haus Nottbeck, Stromberg, was the son of a Westphalian district administrator. His younger brother Maximilian Joseph Franz of Oer (1806–1846) was a writer. Even in his childhood von Oer liked to paint and to draw, and was talented. At the age of 12, he fell ill with scarlet fever and lost his hearing as well as parts of his speech.

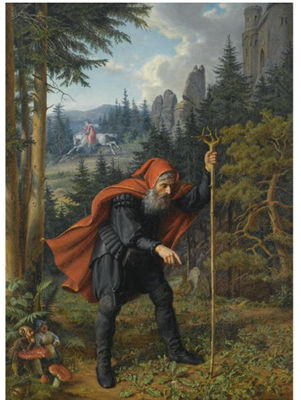
Another one of his paintings

== Adult life ==
At 19, von Oer started with studies at the Royal Academy of Arts Dresden (today the Dresden Academy of Fine Arts). He proved himself exceptionally talented and quickly changed to further studies to the Kunstakademie Düsseldorf, under the teaching of W. von Schadow. In 1836, he and architect H. Matthäi travelled together through the Netherlands and Belgium, eventually arriving at Paris, visiting various French artists. In 1837 he travelled through Southern France into the Italian cities Rome, Capri, and Ischia. His main emphasis was the art of painting historical scenes, however, he painted various landscapes and portraits. His journey to Italy also had much influence on his style, notably on his landscapes and portraits. After returning to Germany, he returned to Dresden, becoming a professor at the academy of the arts. The Princess Gallitzin with her friends from the year 1864, is one of his best-known commissioned works. He died in 1885, in Coswig.

== See also ==
- Oer family
