= Oer family =

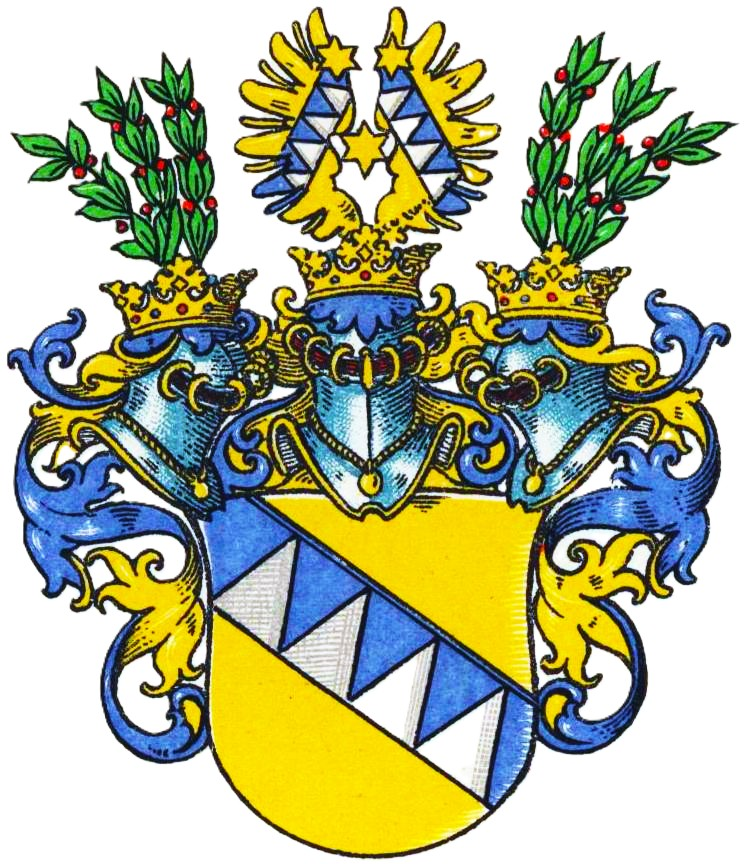
Coat of arms of the Oer family

The Oer family is an old and distinguished German noble family from Oer-Erkenschwick, Westphalia, who can trace their noble lineage up to the 12th century.

== History ==
The first known member of the family was Henricus de Ore, mentioned as a witness at a trial. The progenitor of the family was ritter Godefridus de Uore (knight Gottfried von Oer), who is documented in 1204, asserting his hereditary rights in the office of a local Mayor. Members of the family distinguished themselves as courtiers, writers and artists. In November 1677 they got the title of Baron, which was also recognized in the Kingdom of Prussia in 1844. On 13 June 1906, they were also granted the title of Freiherr in the Kingdom of Saxony.

== Notable members ==
- Antonia Baronin Pilars de Pilar (1872–1946), court lady of the duchess of Mecklenburg-Schwerin
- Friedrich Edmund Freiherr von Oer-Egelborg (1842–1896), chamberlain of prince Charles II of Isenburg
- Maximilian Joseph Franz of Oer (1806–1846) was a German writer
- Theobald Freiherr von Oer (1807–1885), painter
- Freiin Sieglinde von Oer (1935- ), (Austrian politician under her married name Kalnoky).
