= Neckar =

Right tributary of Rhine river in Germany

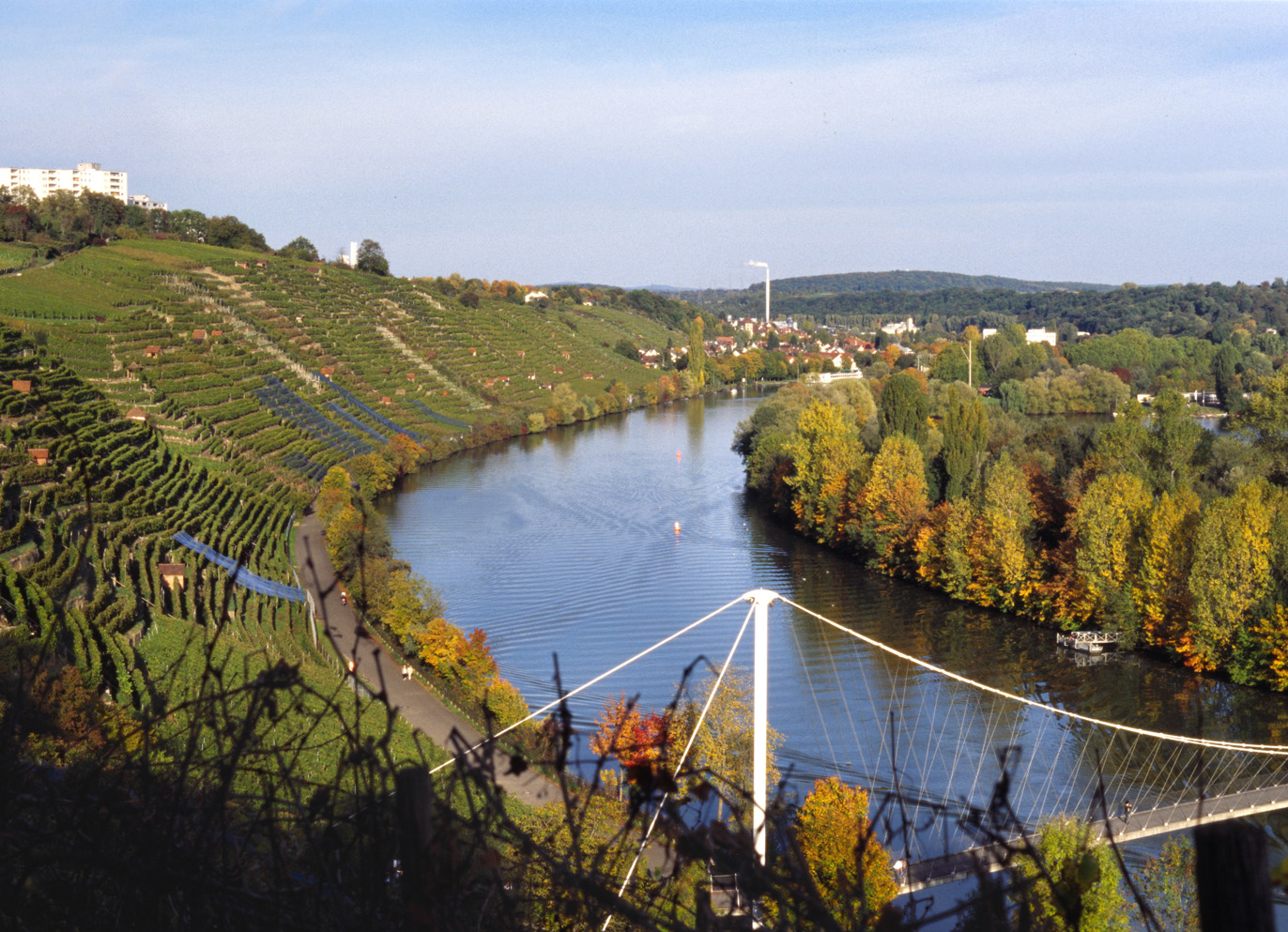
- The Neckar near Stuttgart

Location
- Country: Germany

Physical characteristics
- Source
  - location: Black Forest
  - elevation: 706 m (2,316 ft)
- Mouth
  - location: Rhine
  - coordinates: 49°30′43″N 8°26′14″E
- Length: 362.4 km (225.2 mi)
- Basin size: 13,928 km^{2} (5,378 sq mi)
- Discharge
  - average: 145 m^{3}/s (5,100 cu ft/s)

Basin features
- Progression: Rhine→ North Sea

The Neckar (German pronunciation: [ˈnɛkaʁ]) is a 362-kilometre-long (225 mi) river in Germany, mainly flowing through the southwestern state of Baden-Württemberg, with a short section through Hesse. The Neckar is a major right tributary of the Rhine. Rising in the Schwarzwald-Baar-Kreis near Schwenningen in the Schwenninger Moos conservation area, at a height of 706 m (2,316 ft) above sea level, it passes through Rottweil, Rottenburg am Neckar, Kilchberg, Tübingen, Wernau, Nürtingen, Plochingen, Esslingen, Stuttgart, Ludwigsburg, Marbach, Heilbronn and Heidelberg, before discharging on average 145 m^{3}/s (5,100 cu ft/s) of water into the Rhine at Mannheim, at 95 m (312 ft) above sea level, making the Neckar its 4th largest tributary, and the 10th largest river in Germany. Since 1968, the Neckar has been navigable for cargo ships via 27 locks for about 200 kilometres (120 mi) upstream from Mannheim to the river port of Plochingen, at the confluence with the Fils.

From Plochingen to Stuttgart, the Neckar valley is densely populated and heavily industrialised, with several well-known companies. Between Stuttgart and Lauffen, the Neckar cuts a scenic, meandering, and in many places steep-sided, valley into fossiliferous Triassic limestones and Pleistocene travertine. Along the Neckar's valley in the Odenwald hills many castles can be found, including Hornberg Castle and Guttenberg Castle in Haßmersheim; the decommissioned Obrigheim Nuclear Power Plant and Neckarwestheim Nuclear Power Plant are also located there.

Traditionally the fertile plains have been intensively used for agriculture and its steep valley sides as vineyards.

== Etymology ==
The Neckar was known to the Romans as Nicarus, Nicer or Nicerus, ultimately from the proto-indo-european *nei̯k meaning 'to rise'. The grammatical gender of the name in German is masculine (der Neckar).

== Geography ==
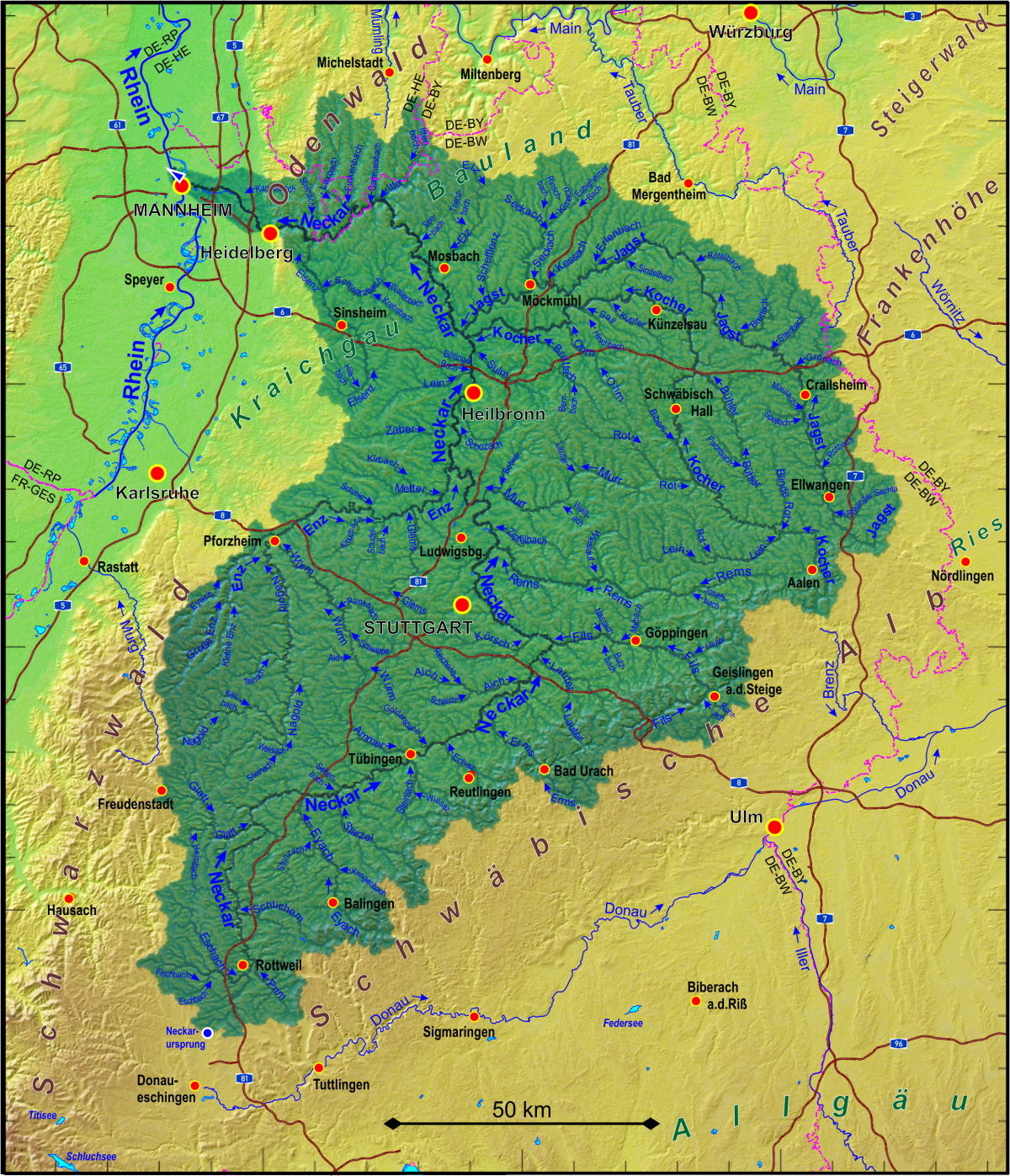
Neckar catchment area

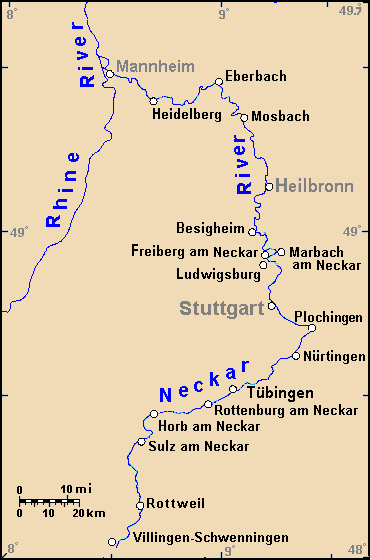
The Neckar in southwest Germany flows from south to north, and joins the Rhine at Mannheim.

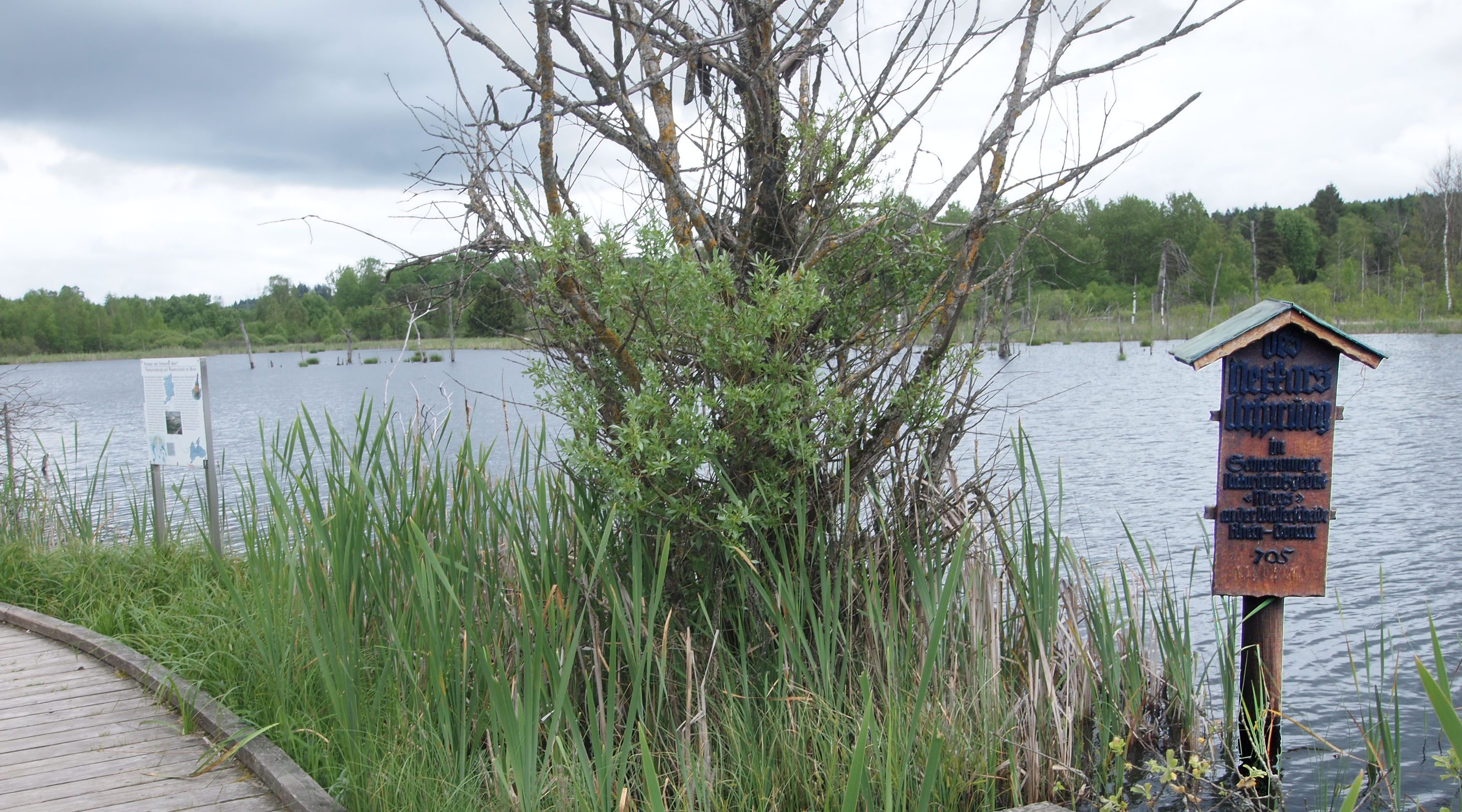
Schwenninger Bog, the source of the Neckar

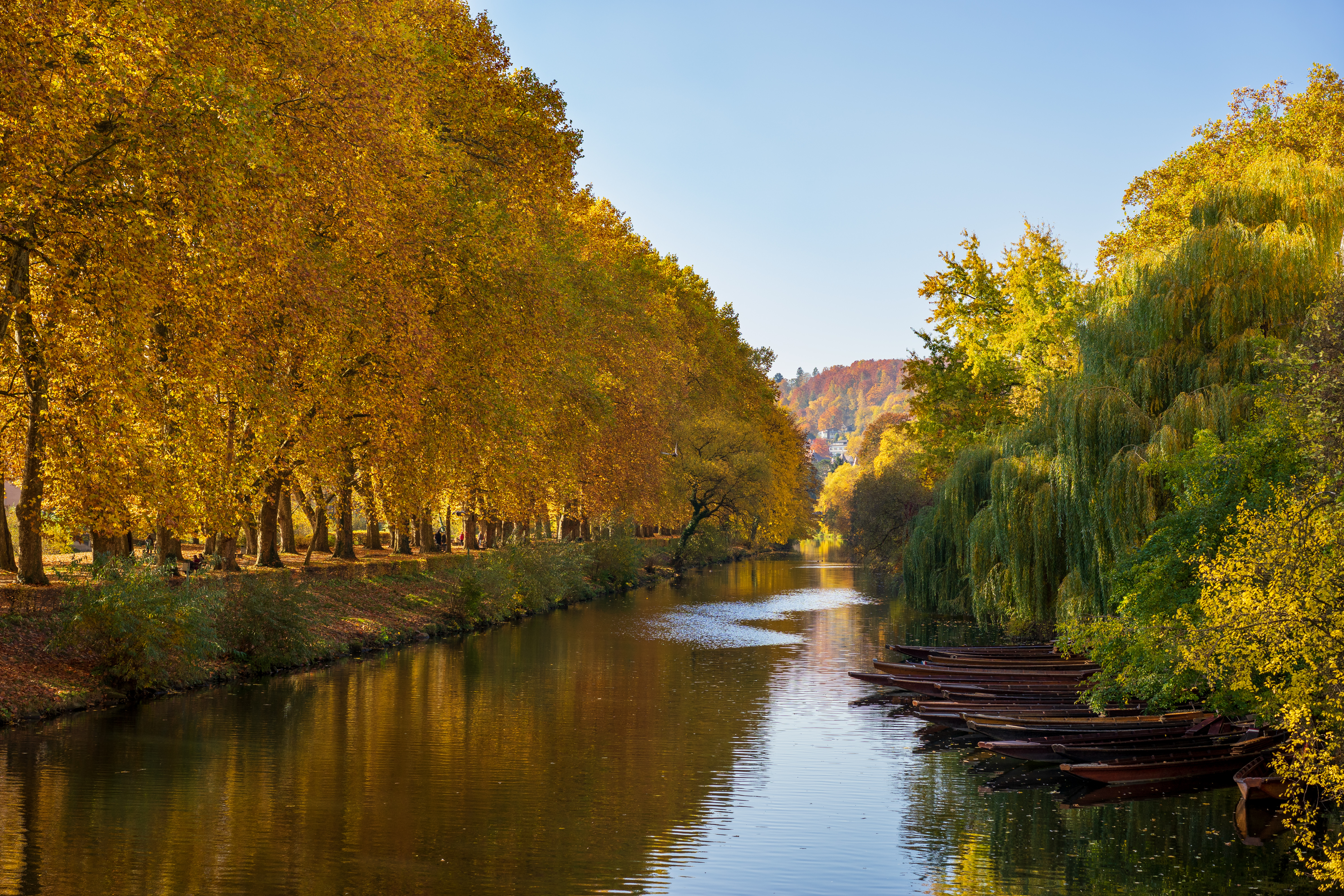
The Neckar in Tübingen, between the Neckarinsel at the left and the Neckarfront of the old town at the right

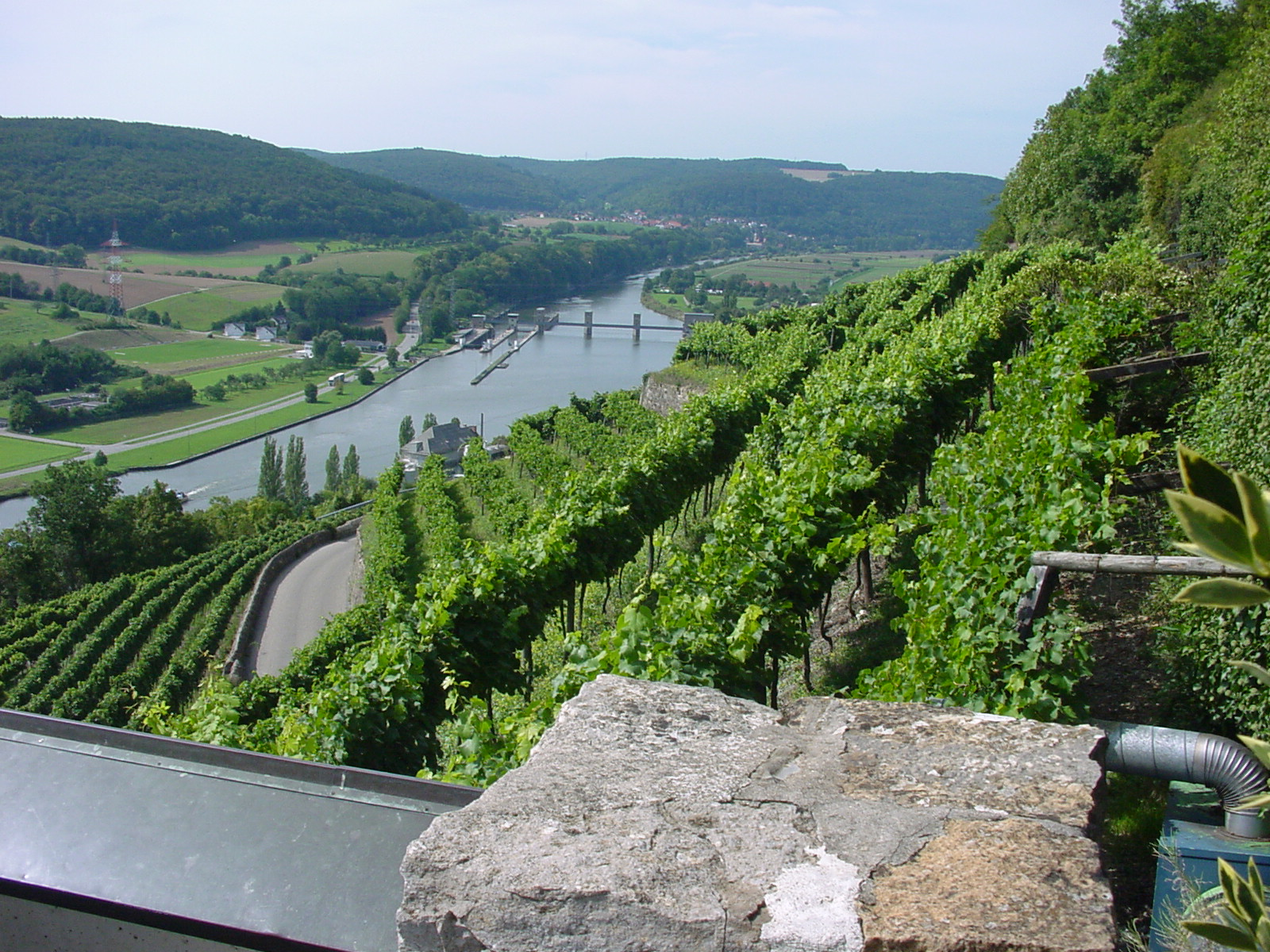
The Neckar near Neckarsulm

=== River course ===
==== Sources ====
The headwater region of the Neckar lies in the Schwenninger Moos between Schwenningen and Bad Dürrheim. The traditionally marked spring of the river lies in the city park Möglingshöhe in Schwenningen.

Prior to the Landesgartenschau Villingen-Schwenningen 2010, the Neckar flowed mostly underground in the city center of Schwenningen. In order to protect the city from the more frequent flooding through overflow of the duct, the river received more space through a new, mostly open riverbed. This riverbed runs largely on the newly constructed horticultural show ground, which was used as the occasion for the remodeling.

==== Headwaters ====
Up to shortly before Rottweil the Neckar is only a small rivulet on the Baar plateau. In Deißlingen-Lauffen it has its only, 4 meters (13 ft) high, waterfall which is drained today. Afterward, the Neckar joins with the Eschach coming from the eastern slopes of the Black Forest which is much more water bearing. Its main tributary Glasbach, which originates at the Brogen, is hydrographically seen as the main river of the Neckar river system.

With this junction above Rottweil the Neckar enters a narrow, wooded valley and for the next 80 km it bores its way towards north between the ranges of the Black Forest and the Swabian Jura. It has created two cut-off meander spurs at the Neckarburg which is spanned by the Neckarburgbrücke. Further down the river lies high above the river the old town of Oberndorf on a Calcareous sinter terrace, which fills one of the bowl-like side valleys. At Horb it turns from the Gäu Plateau towards north east and then follows the western side of the Swabian Jura (Albtrauf). Near Weitingen the valley is traversed by the 127 m high Neckar Viaduct of the A 81. At Rottenburg it enters the wider valley of Tübingen. After Tübingen the valley narrows again. From here onwards, the surrounding elevated grounds are considerably more densely populated.

==== Middle reaches ====
At Plochingen the Neckar turns sharply north west at the "Neckarknie" (knee of the Neckar), the mouth of the Fils coming down from the east, from the Swabian Jura. Beginning from here the river has been expanded into a canalised waterway. It lies up to Stuttgart in a wide, urbanized meadow, which has been built over with industry and is cut through by transportation structures. Only around the Cannstatter valley bend for a short distance it is interspersed by large park areas. Here again the valley sides show limestone-sinter. Between Stuttgart and Lauffen the Neckar cuts a scenic, meandering, and in many places steep-sided, valley into fossiliferous Triassic limestones and Pleistocene travertine. After Stuttgart it turns again towards the general northern direction. In a winding and narrow valley section through the Ludwigsburg (district) the Rems enters from the right at Remseck and then again from the right north of Marbach the Murr. After passing the Hessigheimer Felsengärten the water-rich Enz enters from the left at Besigheim. The former rapid at the Lauffener avulsion of the meander is today under water due to the canalization. In the Lowlands around Heilbronn the Neckar runs again through a wide meadow. At Bad Friedrichshall it takes up within only two kilometers the other two of its large tributaries: First its water-richest tributary, the Kocher and then the officially longest, the Jagst, in total roughly doubling its discharge.

==== Lower reaches ====
Between Bad Wimpfen with its Stauferpfalz and Mosbach, the Neckar enters the Odenwald, where, again in a gorge-like valley, high, elevated, forested slopes line its riverside and especially on the right side, deeply cut valleys enter. At the last of his distinctive knees at Eberbach it turns west, enters at Hirschhorn for a short distance Hessian territory and is then up to Neckarsteinach on long parts the border between Baden-Württemberg and Hessen. At Neckargemünd the Elsenz enters from the left, its lower reaches using a part of the Neckar's former Maurer river loop which extended far south. At the city of Heidelberg, which borders in the north the Odenwald and at the south the Königstuhl (Odenwald), the Neckar travels through a 400m deep valley between mountains. After passing the Heidelberger historic city, the river enters the wide Upper Rhine Plain and after about 25 kilometers, it enters the city of Mannheim roughly at its middle, where it enters the Rhine from the right.

=== Tributaries ===
The largest tributaries of the Neckar are the Enz with the largest drainage area, the Kocher with the highest average water drainage and the longest one, the Jagst. The Kocher tributary Lein is at its end not only longer than the Kocher, but also more water-abundant. Therefore, according to hydrographic convention, the Lein would have to be regarded as the main river of the Kocher water system, making it with then 201 kilometers the longest tributary of the Neckar.

==== Tributaries with 20 km length and more ====
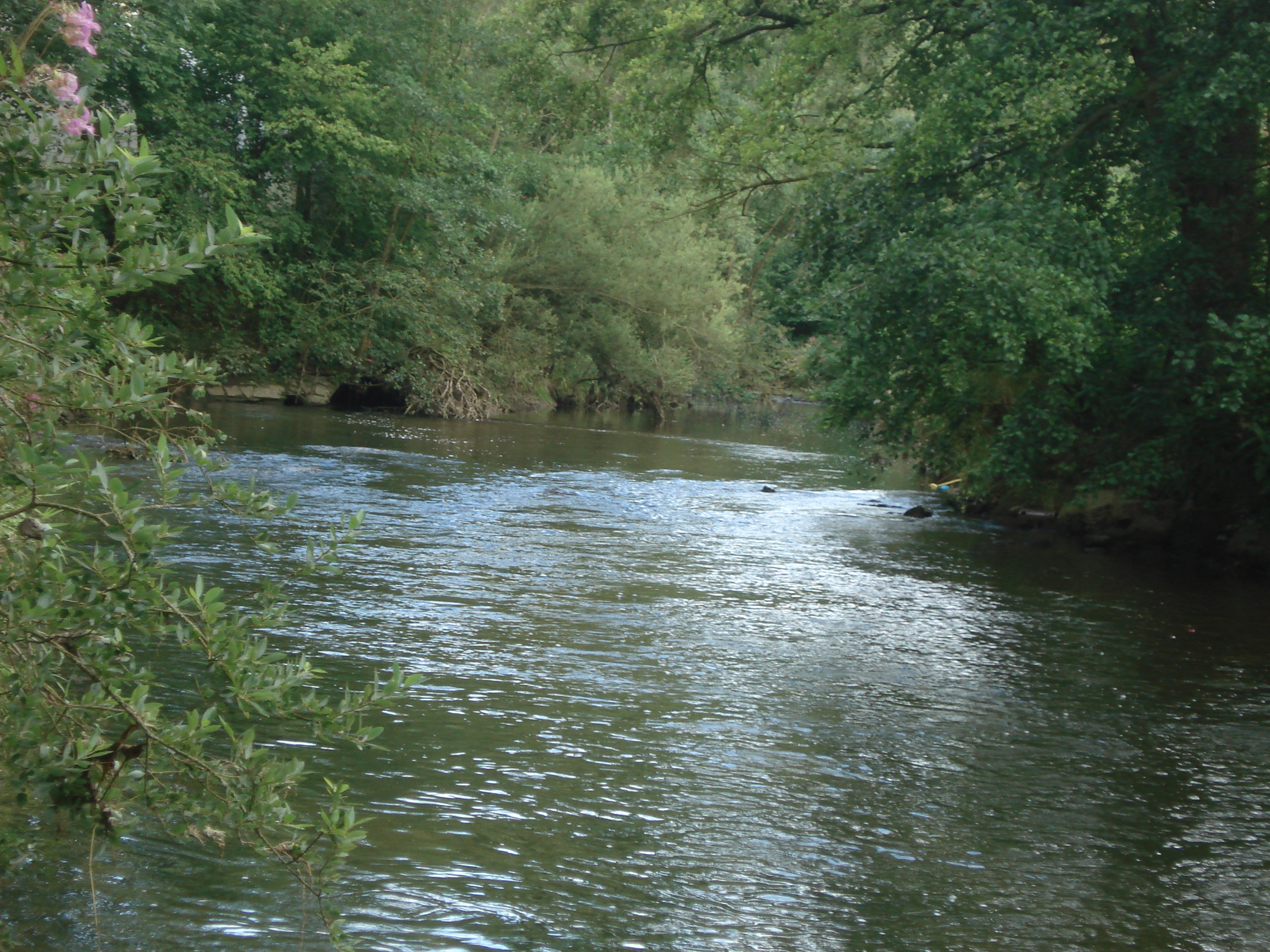
Mouth of the Eschach in Rottweil

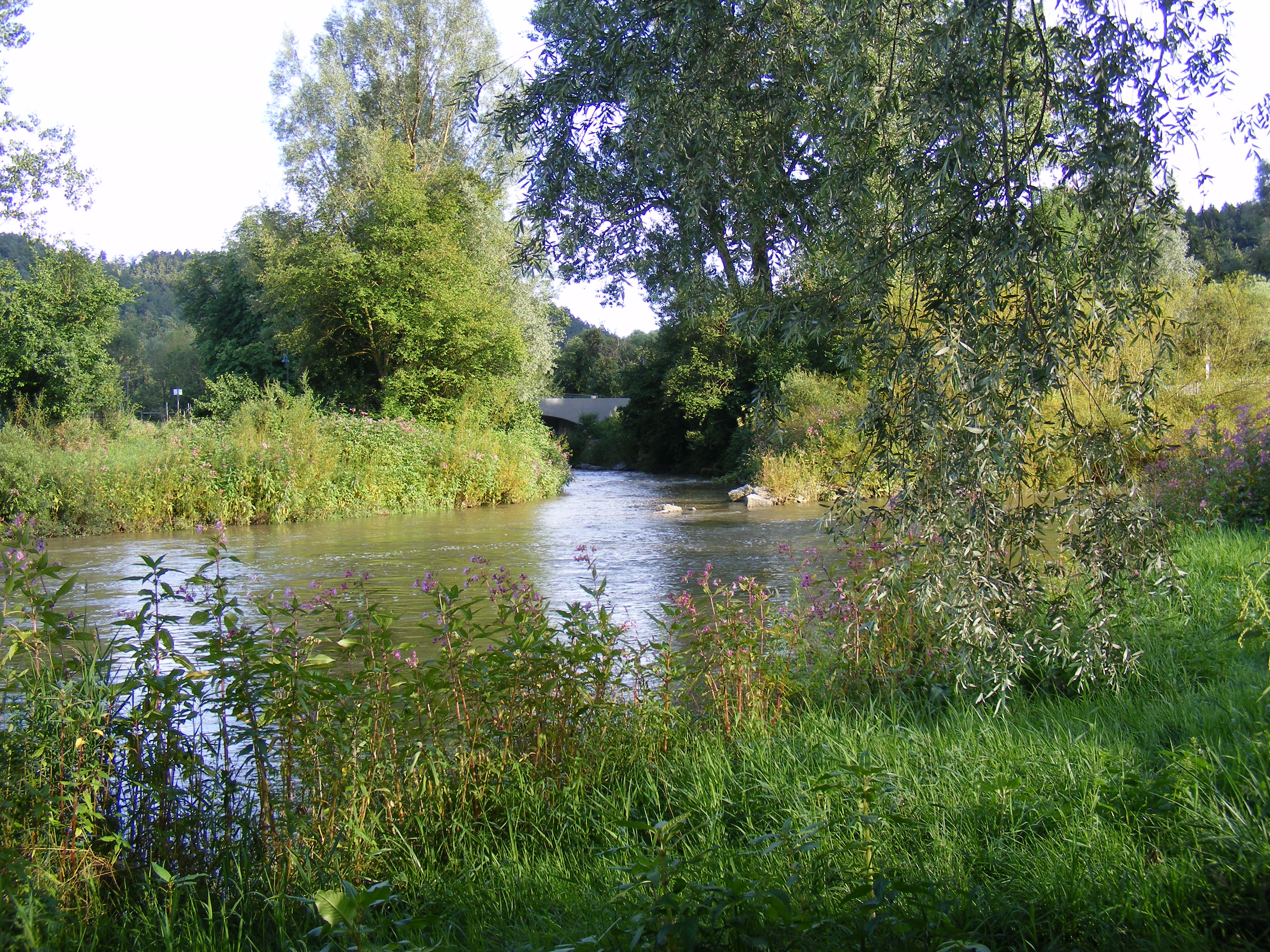
Mouth of the Starzel in Bieringen

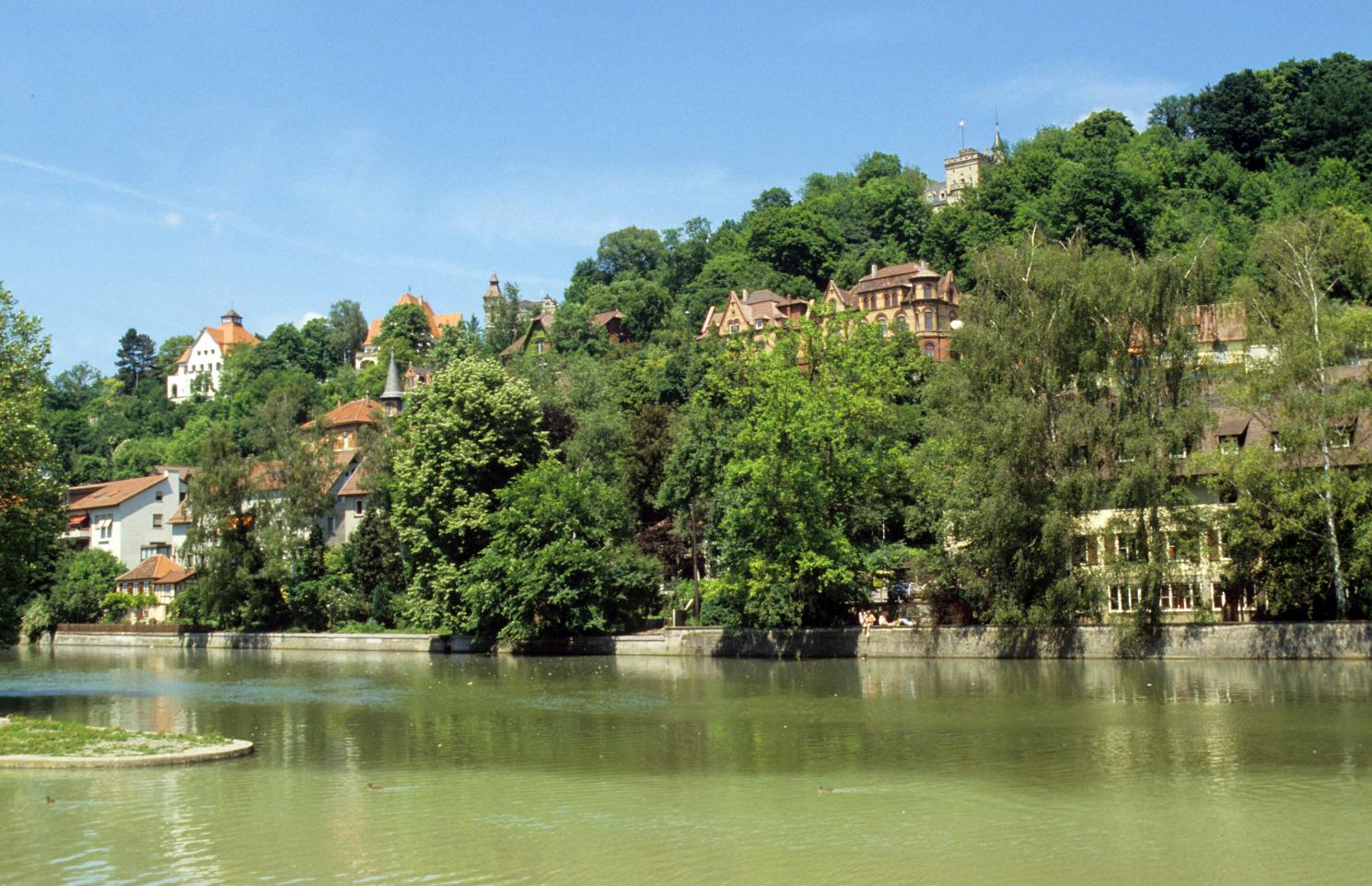
Mouth of the Steinlach in Tübingen

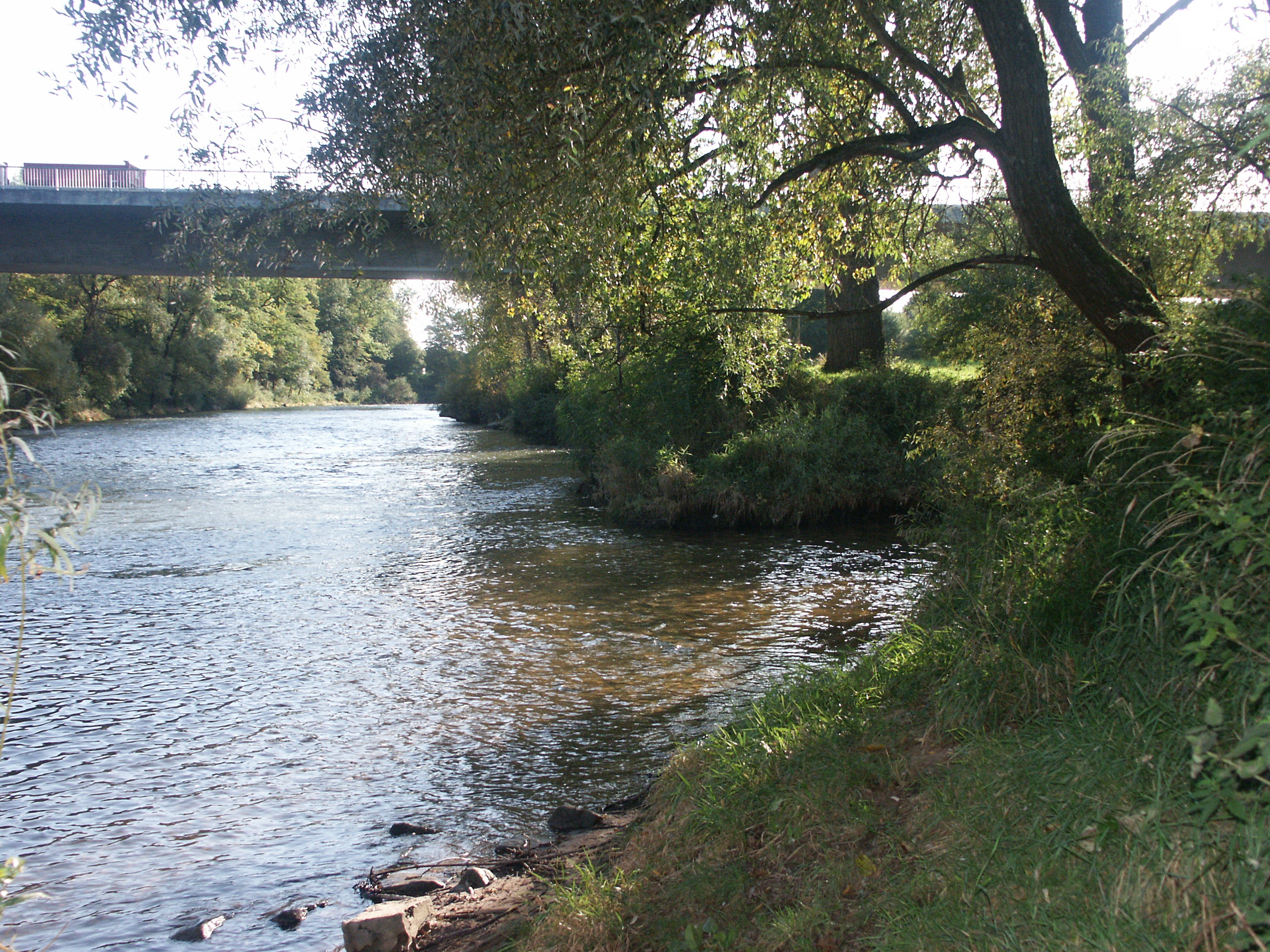
Mouth of the Aich at Nürtingen-Oberensingen

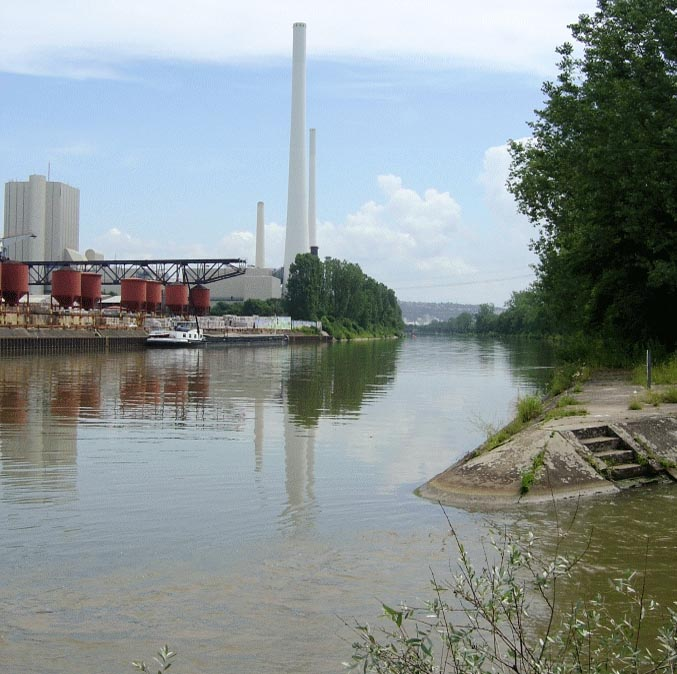
Mouth of the Körsch on the right near Deizisau

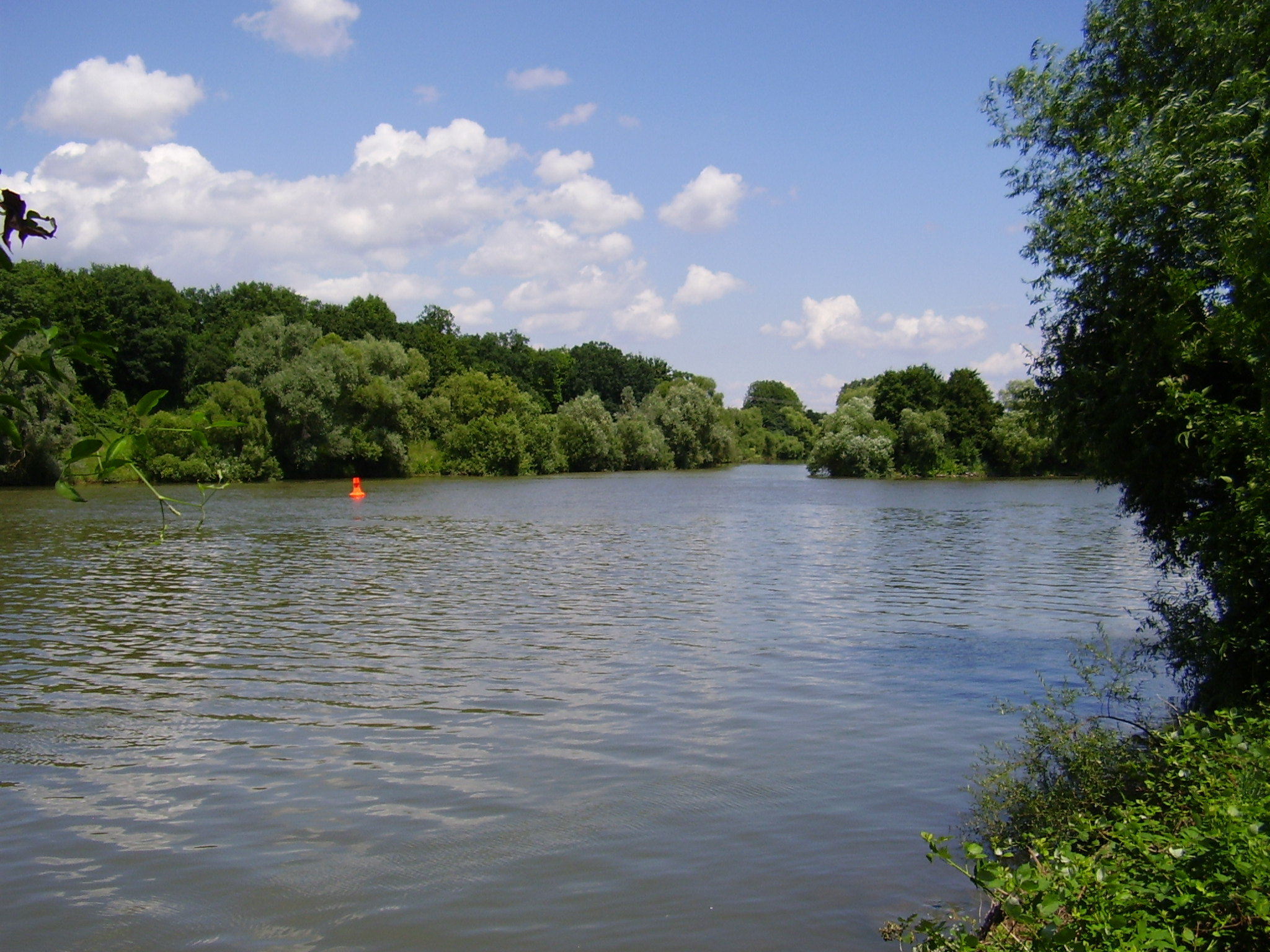
The last of the large tributaries and the overall longest is the Jagst near Bad Friedrichshall Jagstfeld.

Named from source to mouth. According to LUBW-BRSWEB, LUBW-FG10, LUBW-GEZG and TK25. Drainage area mostly according to LUBW-GEZG, else measured on the background map. Distances preferably according to the data sets of the LUBW-FG10, rarely measured on the background map. Named preferably according to TK25.

- Eschach (left tributary at Rottweil-Bühlingen, 38.1 km)
- Prim (right tributary at Rottweil, 21.1 km)
- Schlichem (right tributary at Epfendorf, 34.4 km)
- Glatt (left tributary at Horb-Neckarhausen, 34.2 km)
- Eyach (right tributary at Bf. Eyach, community Eutingen im Gäu, 50.4 km)
- Starzel (right tributary at Rottenburg-Bieringen, 42.8 km)
- Steinlach (right tributary at Tübingen, 25.1 km)
- Ammer (left tributary at Tübingen-Lustnau, 22.5 km)
- Echaz (right tributary at Kirchentellinsfurt, 22.8 km)
- Erms (right tributary at Neckartenzlingen, 32.7 km)
- Aich (left tributary at Nürtingen-Oberensingen, 30.4 km)
- Lauter (right tributary at Wendlingen, 25.7 km)
- Fils (right tributary at Plochingen, 62.8 km)
- Körsch (left tributary west of Deizisau, 26.3 km)
- Rems (right tributary at Remseck, 78.4 km)
- Murr (right tributary at Marbach, 51.5 km)
- Enz (left tributary at Besigheim, 105.5 km)
- Zaber (left tributary at Lauffen, 22.4 km)
- Schozach (right tributary at Heilbronn-Sontheim, 25.6 km)
- Lein (left tributary at Heilbronn-Neckargartach, 27.3 km)
- Sulm (right tributary at Neckarsulm, 26.2 km)
- Kocher (right tributary at Bad Friedrichshall-Kochendorf, 168.7 km)
- Jagst (right tributary at Bad Friedrichshall-Jagstfeld, 190.2 km)
- Elz (right tributary at Mosbach-Neckarelz, 39.8 km)
- Itter (right tributary at Eberbach, 28.0 km)
- Laxbach (right tributary at Hirschhorn, 30.0 km with the longest headwaters)
- Steinach (right tributary at Neckarsteinach, 21.9 km)
- Elsenz (left tributary at Neckargemünd, 53.4 km)

=== Cities and municipalities ===
The Neckar touches, from the source to the mouth, the following districts, cities and municipalities:

- Schwarzwald-Baar-Kreis: Villingen-Schwenningen, Dauchingen
- Landkreis Rottweil: Deißlingen, Villingendorf, Rottweil, Epfendorf, Oberndorf am Neckar, Sulz am Neckar
- Landkreis Freudenstadt: Horb am Neckar, Eutingen im Gäu (Weitinger Mühle)
- Landkreis Tübingen: Starzach (municipality districts Börstingen and Sulzau), Rottenburg am Neckar, Tübingen, Kirchentellinsfurt
- Landkreis Reutlingen: Reutlingen (municipality districts Altenburg, Oferdingen and Mittelstadt), Pliezhausen
- Landkreis Esslingen: Neckartenzlingen, Neckartailfingen, Nürtingen, Oberboihingen, Unterensingen, Wendlingen am Neckar, Köngen, Wernau (Neckar), Plochingen, Deizisau, Altbach, Esslingen am Neckar
- Stuttgart (urban district), city districts Obertürkheim, Hedelfingen, Wangen, Untertürkheim, Stuttgart-Ost, Bad Cannstatt, Münster, Hofen, Mühlhausen)
- Rems-Murr-Kreis: Fellbach (municipality district Oeffingen; only right shore)
- Landkreis Ludwigsburg: Remseck am Neckar, Ludwigsburg (municipality districts Poppenweiler, Hoheneck and Neckarweihingen), Marbach am Neckar, Benningen am Neckar, Freiberg am Neckar, Pleidelsheim, Ingersheim, Mundelsheim, Hessigheim, Besigheim, Walheim, Gemmrigheim, Kirchheim am Neckar
- Landkreis Heilbronn: Neckarwestheim, Lauffen am Neckar, Talheim, Nordheim
- Heilbronn (urban district)
- Landkreis Heilbronn: Neckarsulm, Untereisesheim, Bad Friedrichshall, Bad Wimpfen, Offenau, Bad Rappenau (municipality district Heinsheim), Gundelsheim
- Neckar-Odenwald-Kreis: Haßmersheim, Neckarzimmern, Mosbach (municipality districts Neckarelz and Diedesheim), Obrigheim, Binau, Neckargerach, Zwingenberg
- Rhein-Neckar-Kreis: Eberbach, Schönbrunn (Baden)
- Kreis Bergstraße (Hessen): Hirschhorn (Neckar), Neckarsteinach
- Rhein-Neckar-Kreis: Neckargemünd
- Heidelberg (urban district), city districts Schlierbach, Ziegelhausen, Neuenheim, Altstadt, Bergheim, Wieblingen
- Rhein-Neckar-Kreis: Dossenheim (municipality districts Schwabenheim), Edingen-Neckarhausen, Ladenburg, Ilvesheim
- Mannheim (urban district), city districts Seckenheim, Feudenheim, Neuostheim, Oststadt, Neckarstadt-Ost, Innenstadt/Jungbusch, Neckarstadt-West

== River history ==
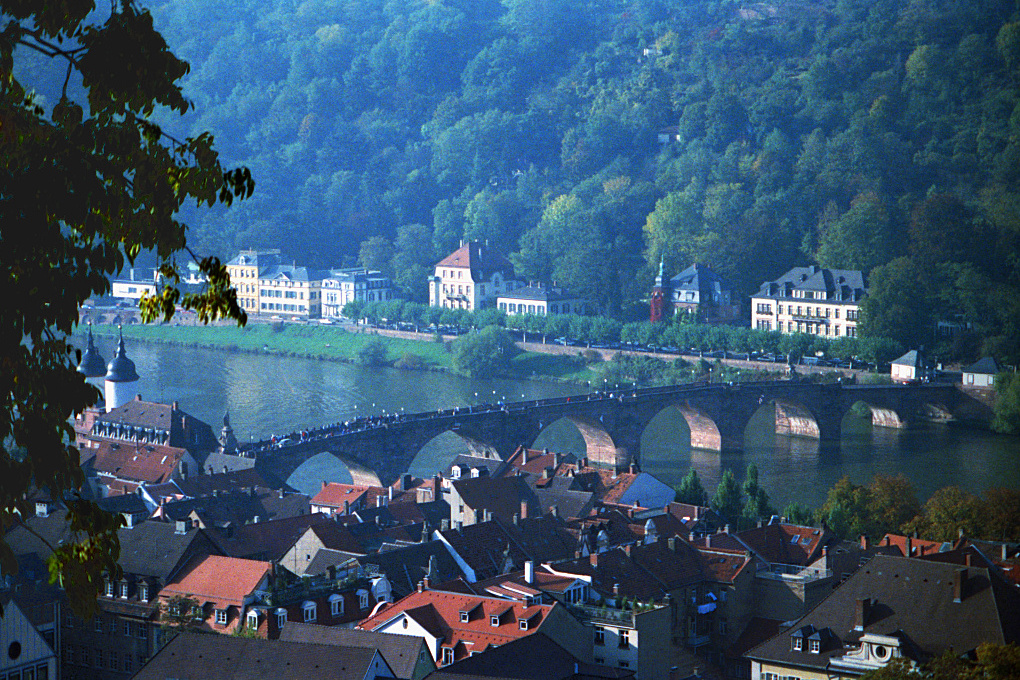
Old Bridge, Heidelberg, built in 1788

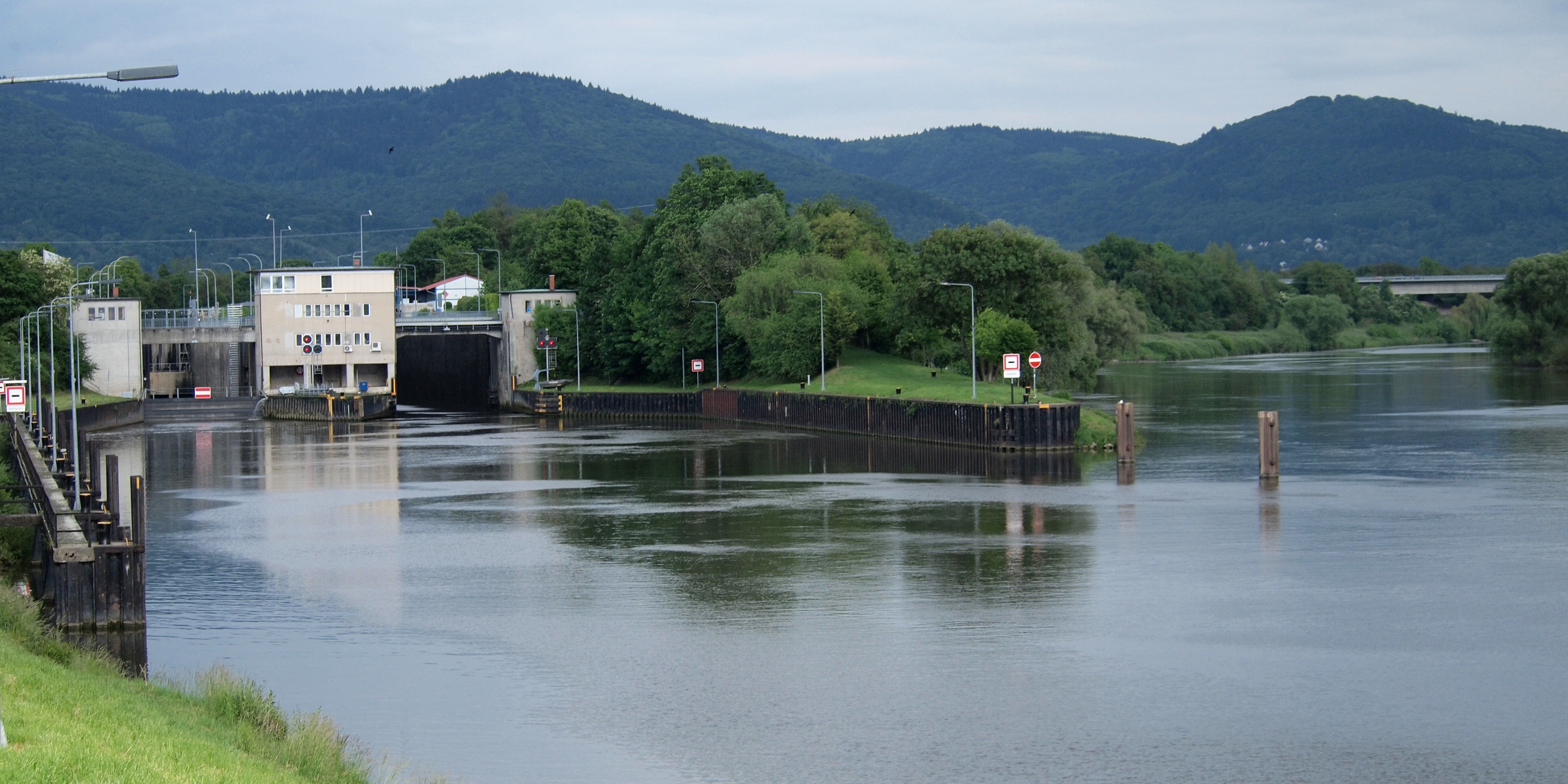
Lock on Wieblingen channel from Heidelberg and open river at Schwabenheim

The primal Neckar started off as an escarpment riverlet due to the slow rise of the Black Forest and the connected slow erosive retraction of the South German Scarplands.

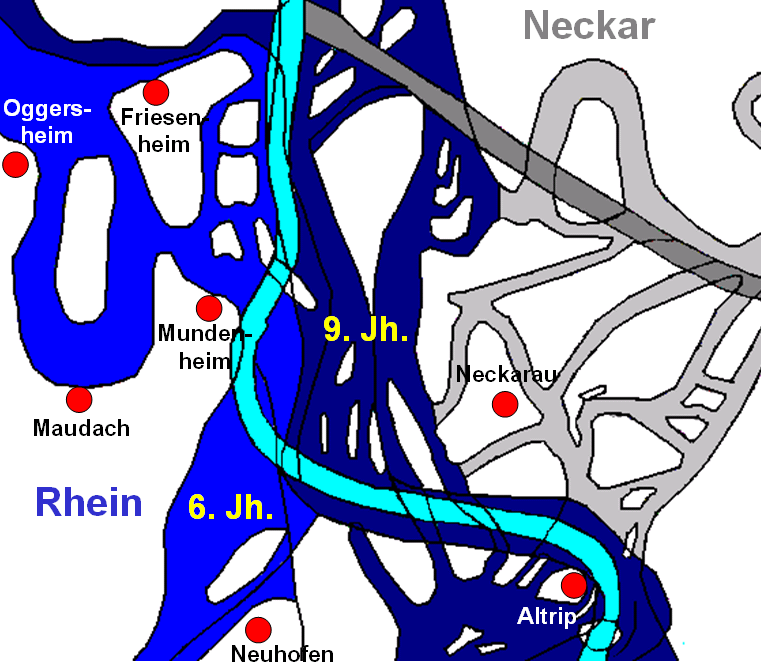
Historic routes of the Neckar at the mouth

For a long time it flowed on the high plains of the different Gäu Plateaus created through the hard chalks of the Muschelkalk. At Horb the river was redirected to the northeast due to the rift structure of the so-called Swabian Lineament, which lies roughly parallel to the escarpment of the Swabian Jura. Following that the Neckar cut into the Muschelkalk plateau between Rottweil and Rottenburg as well as the younger Keuper and Jura layers in the northeast, and created narrow water gaps in the area of the morphologically hard chalks and sandstones.

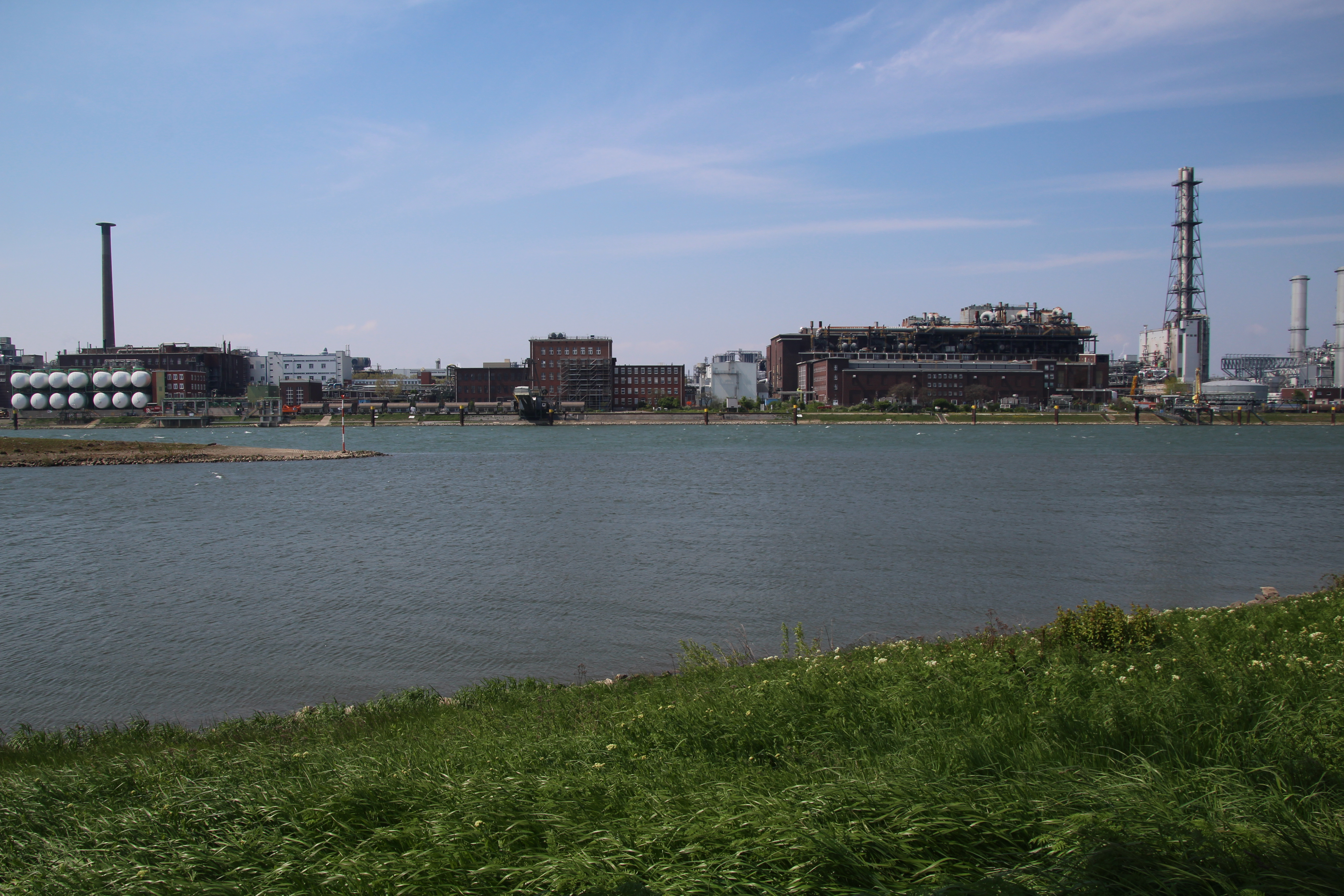
Neckar mouth today

The river deepening was also caused by the further rise of the Black Forest as well as the retracting erosion of the attacking younger Neckar route. This younger Neckar route tapped the primal Neckar system at Plochingen (hence the Neckarknie), which flowed through the primal lone to the primal Danube. Another influence on this river area was the Schurwald, a dissected cuesta of the filder rift, working as a river guideline.

Today's lower reaches used to be those of the primal Enz. Until, through the erosive retraction of a tributary of the primal Enz near Besigheim, the Neckar river network was tapped. That is how the Enz became a tributary of the Neckar. Another trace of the former north western extent of the Danube river network is the Eschach running from north west to south east, hence towards the primal Danube. With the retraction of the escarpment, it was tapped by a Neckar tributary and redirected by about 90° to the east. Considering river history, it was never a headstream of the Neckar.

Until 2000 years ago the Neckar flowed through a pastureland in the Oberrheinische Tiefebene in a tangle of meanders, slings, old waters and cut of arms between the Rhine in the west and the foot of the Odenwald in the east until it finally entered the Rhine only north of Darmstadt at Trebur; roughly 50 km north of today's confluence in Mannheim. On large stretches you can still see it on aerial photos.

In the 13th century, the confluence was south of Mannheim. A great flood changed the course of the Neckar in around 1275. Since then it has entered the Rhine north of the city. The last change here took place in connection with the straightening of the Rhine by the Friesenheimer breakthrough west of today's Friesenheimer Island. Previously the Neckar entered the Rhine in the area of today's industrial port of Mannheim. Its new riverbed was also the reason for the relocation of the Neckar. After the old Neckar was cut off in early 1869, it followed the path of the new Neckar breakthrough, which was finished by 1880.

== River landscape ==
=== Natural landscape ===
Narrow and widening valleys alternate along the Neckar's course. The narrows are mostly deepenings into the Muschelkalk plateau and the Buntsandstein below. Widenings developed in the area of morphologically soft clay and marl. Wide valley meadows also developed through the strong backfilling with Aue clay since the start of settlement in the Neolithic and the accompanying deforestation and soil erosion. In the area of the narrows the meander and cut-off meander spurs stand out. The meanders were formed through the primal Neckar, which sluggishly flowed through the almost even Muschelkalk plateau, forming the basic structures during the deepening phases and cutting into the hard Muschelkalk. The best known cut-off meander spur is the one at Lauffen; it cut through in historical times and created a waterfall (historic: Laufen). At the cutbanks one can find rocks, formed by the limestone of the upper Muschelkalk. For example, the rock gardens at Hessigheim. They lie on the marls and clays of the middle Muschelkalks and can sag in whole stone packages, so-called Schollen, down towards the Neckar. In the Odenwald narrow ravines and gorges lead into the Neckar from both sides, as for example, the Wolfschlucht and the Margarethenschlucht.

=== Cultural landscape ===
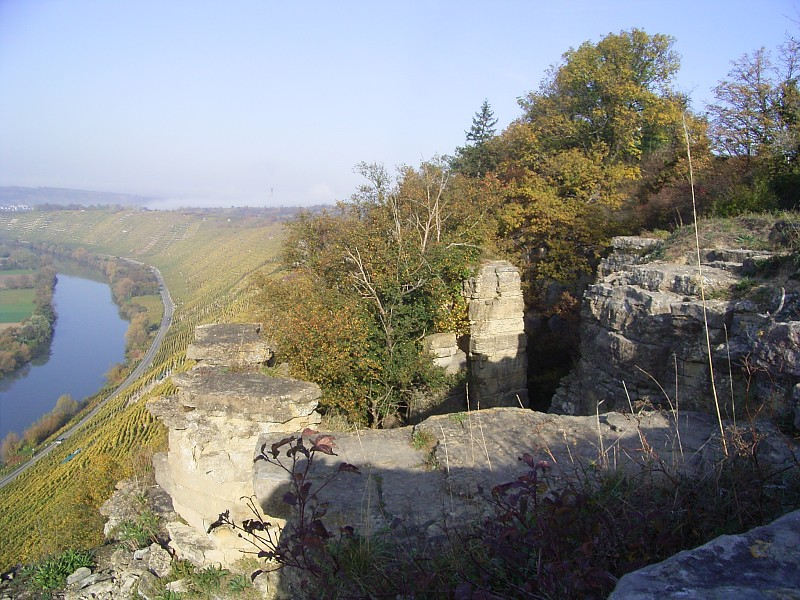
View from the Hessigheimer rock gardens into the Neckar valley

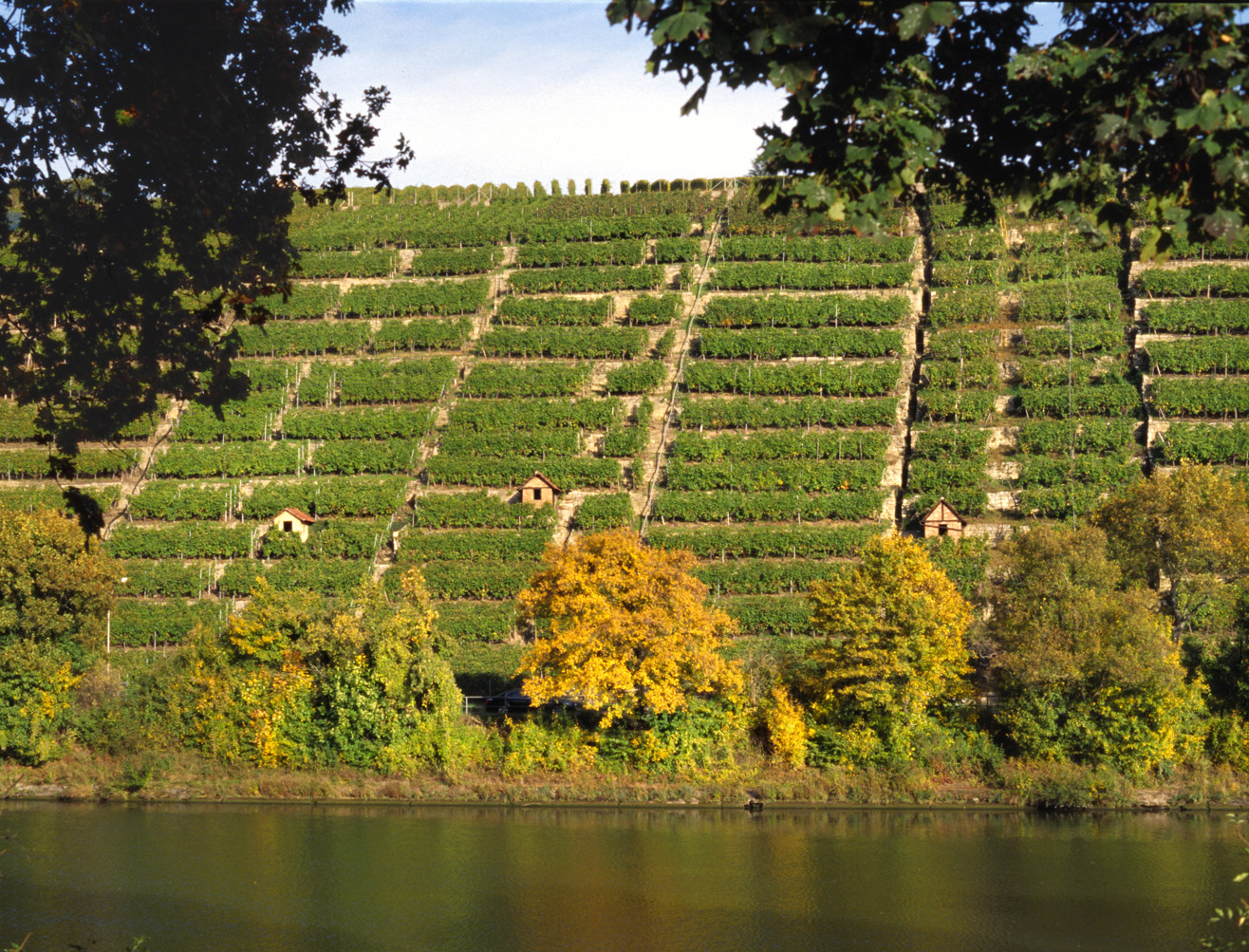
Stone terraces at the Cannstatter Zuckerle, located on the Neckar slopes in Stuttgart

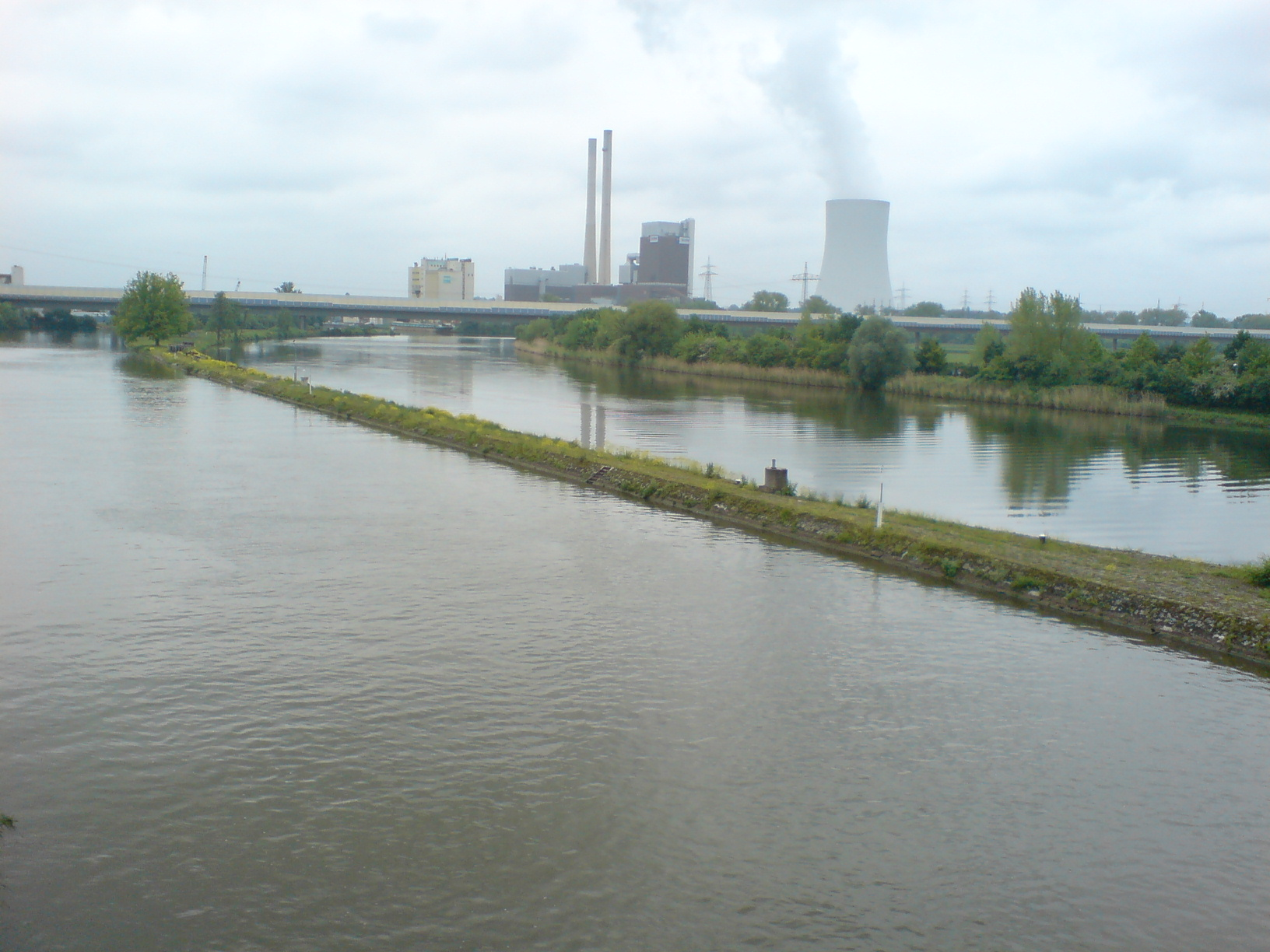
The Neckar in Neckarsulm, in the background the coal power station of Heilbronn

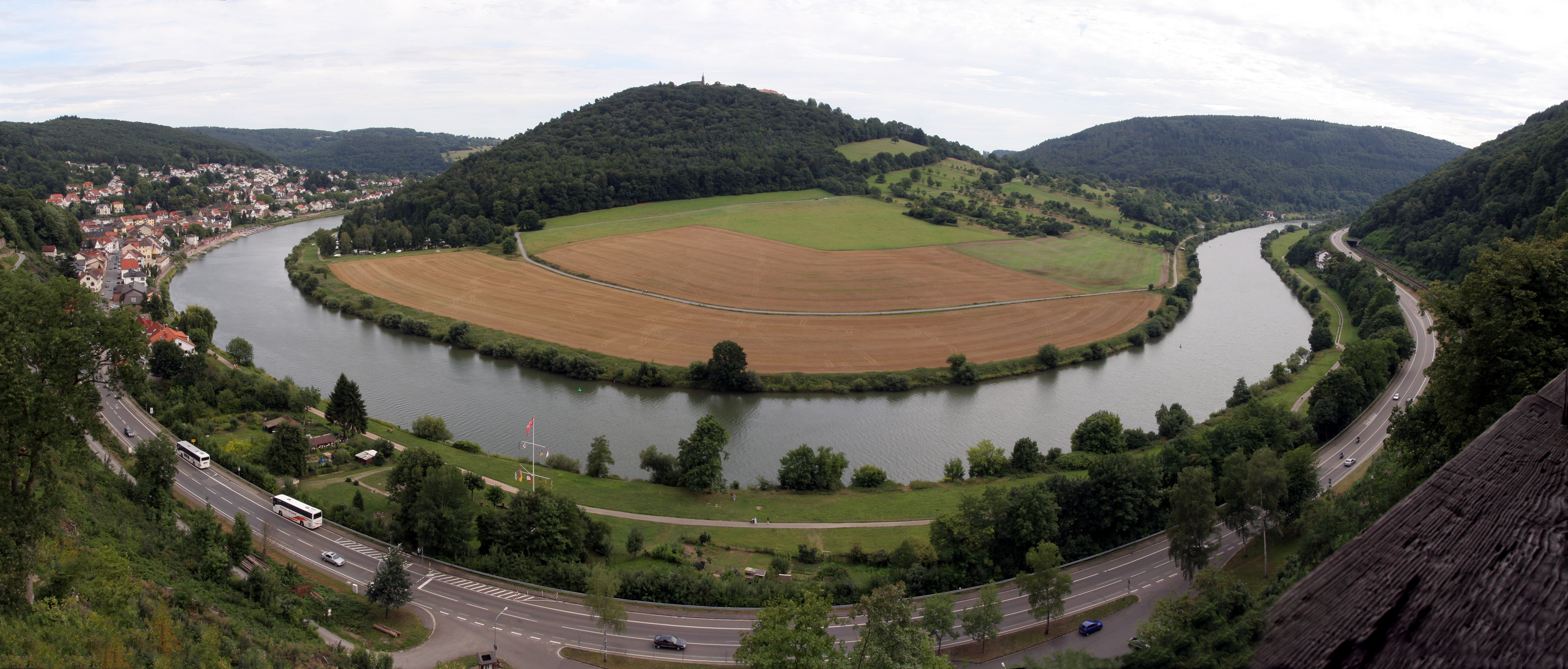
The Neckar loop around the Dilsberg castle, as seen from the Hinterburg

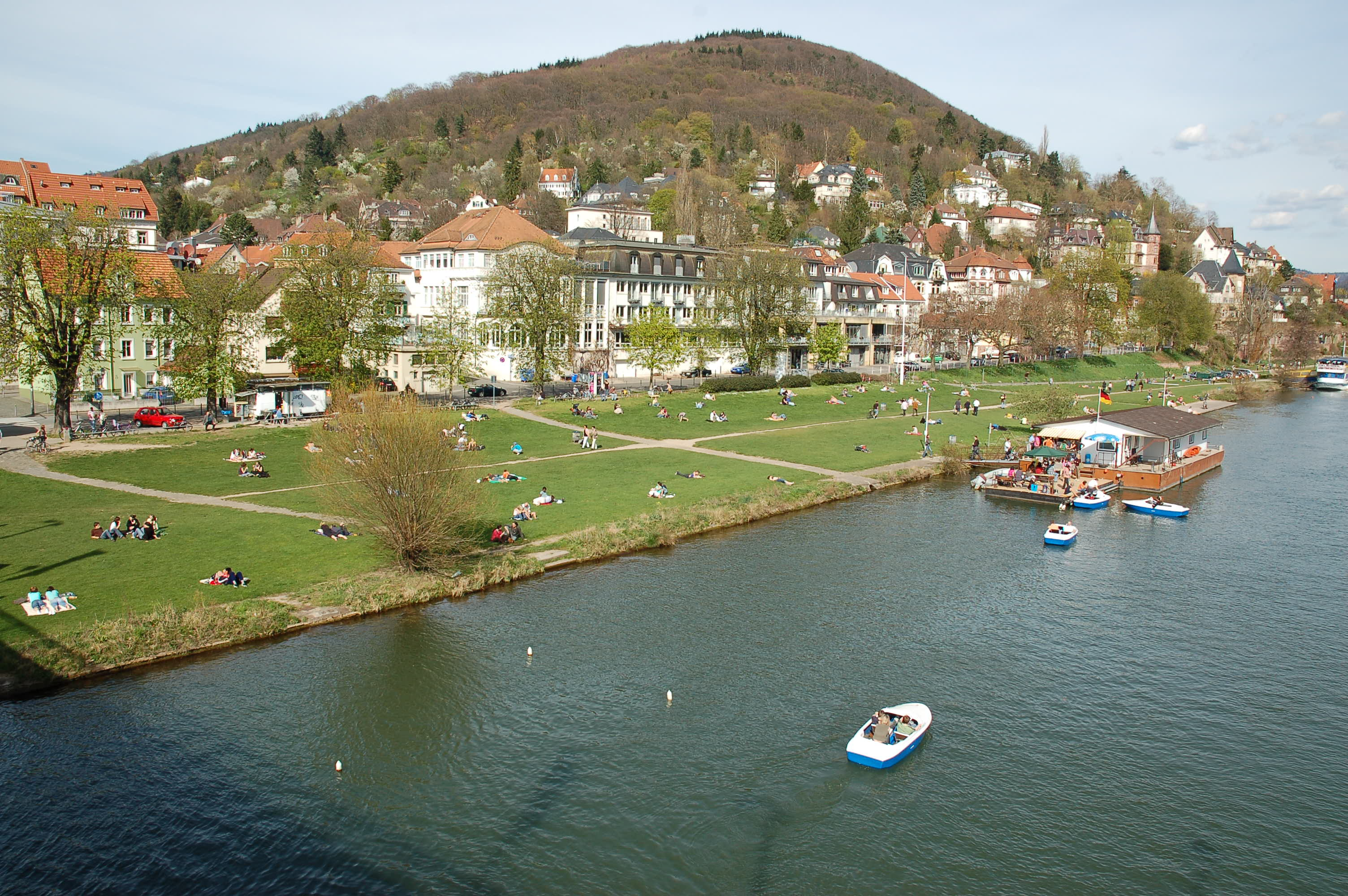
Heidelberg, the Neuenheim riverside with the neckar meadow and the Heiligenberg

Due to the risk of flooding the valley plains remained unsettled for a long time, but the nutritious and, due to its good structure, very arable land was intensively used for agriculture, and to a large degree the valley plains are still used agriculturally today. The fertile soil allows the cultivation of lucrative specialty crops like vegetables or hops, for example, between Rottenburg and Tübingen.

Gravel pit quarrying in the valley plains takes away agricultural land, but created large lakes, nowadays used for recreational purposes. These borrow pits also became habitat for birds, amphibians and aquatic creatures. Such large borrow pits can be found for example near Kirchentellinsfurt and between Freiberg am Neckar and Pleidelsheim. The gravel bodies of the Neckar have an additional role as water reservoir and are in many places used for drinking water production. The paths usually went over the heights and only crossed the valleys where there were fords over the Neckar.

This changed with the onset of industrialisation in the 19th century. It brought fundamental conflicts regarding the land usage of the flat valley plain. Large even spaces became sought after for industrial sites. The Neckar was mostly straightened in order to prevent flooding and to gain areas for industrial buildings. The river itself was expanded over the course of centuries. With the development into a heavy shipping lane in the early 20th century, the last freely flowing parts between Plochingen and the mouth disappeared and the whole river in this part nowadays is characterized by dam areas. In the strongly textured Neckar area the valley became the only possibility for modern transportation infrastructure. Construction of railway lines and avenues in the valley plains changed the Neckar valley from a cultural to an industrial landscape.

One example is the densely populated and industrialised Neckar valley between Plochingen and Bad Cannstatt, which harbors large companies such as Daimler AG (the maker of Mercedes Benz cars) and Mahle GmbH and recreational facilities with large area consumption like the MHPArena, the Hanns-Martin-Schleyer-Halle or the Cannstatter Wasen, the second-largest fair of Germany. The term Wasen gives a clue, that there used to be a floodplain on which the fair was held. Distinctive points in the industrial landscape of the Neckar valley are the high chimneys of the coal-fired power station Altbach/Deizisau and Heilbronn as well as the assembly halls of the Daimler-engine plant in Untertürkheim and the Audi plant in Neckarsulm.

Along the Neckar's valley in the Odenwald hills many castles can be found, including Hornberg Castle and Guttenberg Castle in Haßmersheim; the now-mothballed Obrigheim Nuclear Power Plant and the active Neckarwestheim Nuclear Power Plant are also located there.

In contrast to the plains, the mostly steep slopes are often forested and in forestry use. The sun-exposed south-facing sites are frequently used for vineyards and are terraced with dry walls. There the local red wine grapes Trollinger, Schwarzriesling and Lemberger are cultivated, which are also traditionally mostly drunk in Württemberg. Especially the middle Neckar around Besigheim and Lauffen is characterized by in parts extremely steep vineyards, which can be cultivated only by hand.

The vine terraces at the Neckar together with the drainage area of the tributaries deliver the largest part of the cultivation area of the Württemberg wine region. The vineyards at the lower reaches from Heinsheim to Heidelberg are part of the Baden wine region. Until the end of the 19th century, vineyard cultivation was more extensive in the Neckar valley including unfavorable sites. Today these have been abandoned and gone fallow, reclaimed by wildlife. One example is the southern slopes of the Spitzberg above the Neckar near Tübingen.

The river's course provides a popular route for cyclists, especially during the summer months. The slopes of the Neckar are preferred areas for high-level residential areas because they allow wide, unobstructed views.

=== Renaturation ===
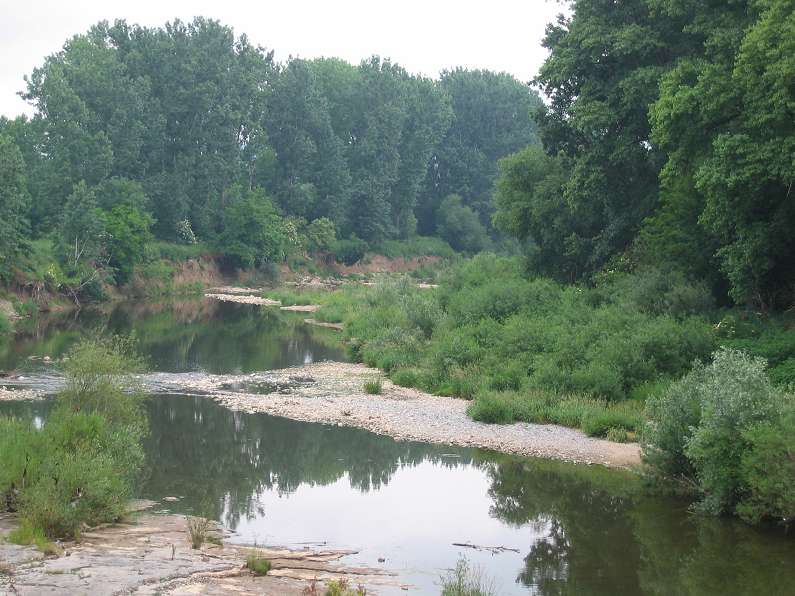
The unregulated old Neckar at Freiberg am Neckar

The diverse usage of raw water and waterway, as well for the production of hydropower brought with it substantial interventions into the ecological structure of the river. Multiple initiatives are advocated for the land restoration the Neckar, the ecological enhancement of the river network, the improvement of the water quality, improved flood control and the creation of attractive local recreational areas alongside the river. Only recently within the frame of the nationwide campaign lively rivers and the initiative Lebendiger Neckar (German: lively Neckar), it was begun to free it from its partly-existing concrete corset. The river has in parts been redeveloped as a local recreational area and habitat for animals and plants. It still remains a symbol of endangered nature with the highest power plant density in Germany. At an oxygen content of below 4 mg/L power plant owners have to run specially designed turbines to inject air into the water. As of 2003, no mass die-off of fish due to lack of oxygen had occurred for 20 years.

== Climate ==
The Neckar valley functions as a cold air basin, which means that under cloudless skies the heavier, cold, night air which develops on the sparsely vegetated plateaus and hills, flows into the basin and concentrates there. Especially during the cold season, such "cold lakes" can contribute to the creation of fog while all around on the plateaus the sun shines. The orography of the Neckar valley facilitates such inversive weather conditions.

The Neckar valley is known for its wine cultivation climate and the cultivation of Trollinger, Lemberger, Kerner, Müller-Thurgau amongst other locally grown grape varieties. Wine cultivation has receded over the 20th century and cultivation of the "Württemberger Wein" is mostly restricted to the south-facing slopes with high radiation gain in the Neckar valley and its side valleys, as wine cultivation is labor-intensive and in Württemberg competitive only in the best sites.

== Navigation ==
Various excavations of harbor installations and findings lead to the conclusion that the Neckar navigation already existed during the Roman Age in the first century. At this time, travel was concentrated on the lower Neckar. The main purpose of travel at this time was probably the transportation of construction material for the Limes and provisions. Later the Neckar navigation was probably restarted by the Franks.

=== Historical development ===
==== Timber floating from 1100 ====
Starting from 1100 the usage of the Neckar as a waterway with line boats and rafts has been attested. The river was already blocked by weirs in the surroundings of several cities during the High Middle Ages. In Heilbronn a harbour was mentioned for the first time in 1146. The Neckar privilege granted by Holy Roman Emperor Louis IV in 1333 allowed the free imperial city the construction of a weir. After its construction, the continuous traffic on the river was blocked for several centuries, creating an annoyance for the neighbours. The permission of passage for raftsman therefore had to be determined contractually. In 1342, Württemberg, the Markgrafschaft Baden, and the free imperial city signed an agreement to open the Neckar for rafts between Besigheim and Heilbronn. A treaty from 1476 between the free imperial city Esslingen, Württemberg and Austria fixed free rafting trade as well. The last raft went through Tübingen down the Neckar river on October 26, 1899.

The wood from the eastern Northern Black Forest was shipped through the Neckar and then the Rhine up to Holland. Because of the developing seafaring, shipyards had a large demand for wood. Firewood from the Schurwald was also shipped on the Neckar, after being combined in rafts up to 260 meters long at Plochingen.

==== Navigation from the 16th century onward ====
The Neckar gained importance as a waterway in the middle of the 16th century due to the beginning upper German trade. Despite many interventions in the river course in order to improve navigation, the river which had a towpath, was because of dangerous rapids and shallows only navigable for smaller barges and this mostly only up to Heilbronn.

Making the upper Neckar navigable was then pushed ahead by Christoph, Duke of Württemberg who got the necessary permission from Emperor Karl V. in 1553. The city of Heilbronn still insisted on its rights so that the river was blocked at Heilbronn which meant that the upper Neckar and therefore Württemberg remained cut off from the navigation coming from the Rhine. All shipped goods were subject to Heilbronner staple right. In the late 16th century, Duke of Württemberg, Frederick I had plans for the navigation passage but discarded those in 1598 and instead planned to construct a württembergian trade port in Kochendorf. – which was as unsuccessful as his successors plans to build one in Untereisesheim. During the times of need in the 17th century, the navigation was insignificant.

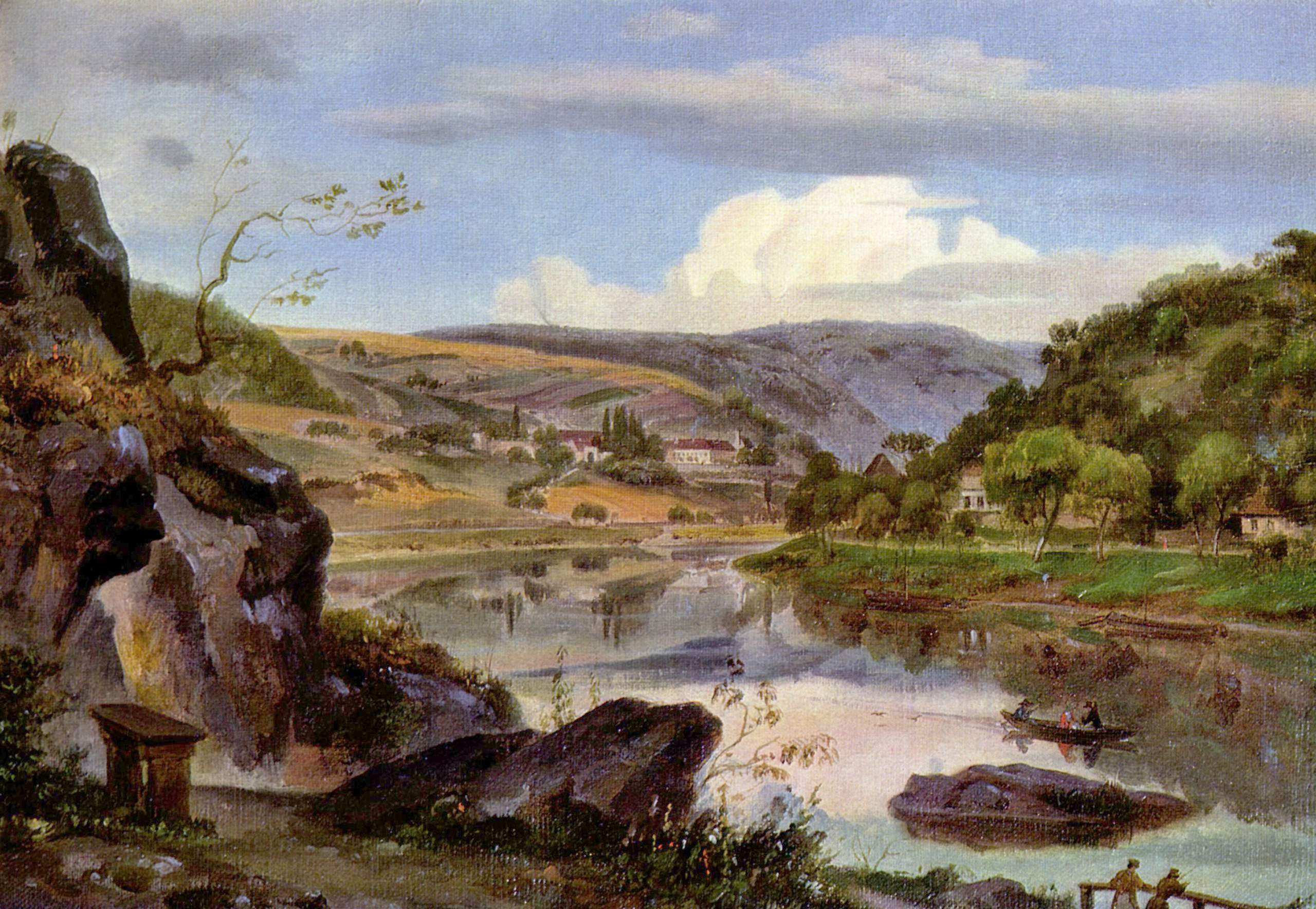
Stift Neuburg und das Neckartal, Ernst Fries, around 1830

Immediately above Mannheim interventions were necessary due to regular floods. After 1622, smaller corrections were made at the back then-existing Neckar loops between Mannheims Feudenheim and today's Friedrich-Ebert-Bridge. Floods still occurred and threatened the city, lastly in 1784 and 1789. The situation was alleviated through the straightening of the river bed by means of for breakthroughs in combination with the lowering of the river bed as well as fortifications and dams.

After consolidation of the situation in the 18th century, electoral palatinate market ships regularly travelled on the lower Neckar river. On the upper Neckar boats regularly travelled between Heilbronn and Cannstatt for several years around 1720; the expansion of the navigation to the Württembergian Plochingen further up the river failed due to the free imperial city of Esslingen. While the electoral palatinate shipping on the lower Neckar was quite successful, the shipping on the upper Neckar was soon stopped again as the river was not suitably enough expanded for a navigation and moreover no funding was available for the further upgrading. Württemberg and the Electoral Palatinate signed a trade agreement in order to start up the Neckar navigation between Mannheim and Cannstatt during a time of economical rise in the late 18th century. In 1782 the previous two and the free imperial city of Heilbronn agreed upon facilitations in the Neckar trade but which were only of administrative nature. The Neckar still remained blocked at the weir in Heilbronn.

The Napoleonic times around 1800 brought a downfall to the Neckar navigation. On the one hand – because most parts of the lower Neckar area had fallen to Baden and the free imperial cities of Heilbronn and Esslingen to Württemberg – the many disputes and obstructions of the former small states did not hamper the trade anymore. But during the Continental System the navigation was restricted and ships and material were confiscated. The introduction of the Mannheimer Stapels ("Mannheim stable") in 1808 meant that the merchants of Mannheim gained control over almost all Neckar trade. During the German Campaign of 1813 only small ships travelled on the Neckar, mainly military transports. The Congress of Vienna demanded the freedom of traffic on the Neckar and Rhine rivers in 1814/1815.

==== Continuous navigability with the Wilhelmskanal in 1821 ====
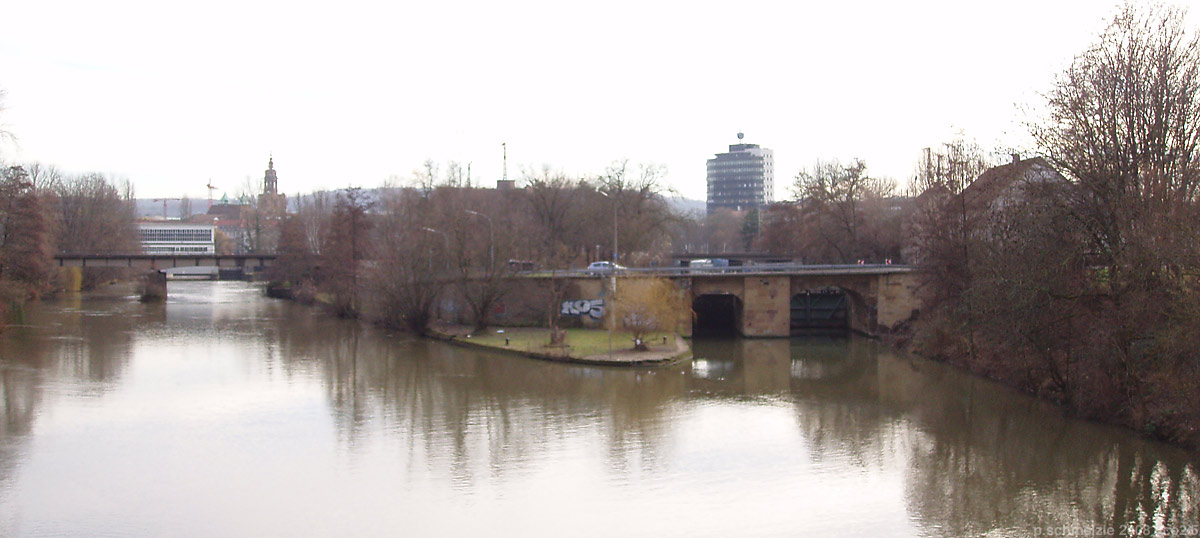
Mouth of the Heilbronner Wilhelmskanal (right) into the side arm Heilbronn (old neckar) (left). The canal made the Neckar continuously navigable in 1821. The lock with the bridge is from 1884.

The 550-meter-long Wilhelmskanal ("Wilhelms canal") was constructed in Heilbronn from 1819 to 1821. The reason was the bypassing of the entire weir area and many mills. After further river construction measures, the Neckar became navigable all the way between the Rhine and Cannstatt. A lock gate at the upper end of the canal could turn it during floods into a port of refuge which was, already in 1829, expanded into a port of transshipment. In 1827 the Mannheimer Stapel was lifted through which the Neckar navigators gained back free access to the Rhine river. The Rheinschiffahrtsakte ("Mannheim Act") from 1831 and in consequence of it the Neckarschiffahrtsordnung ("Neckar navigation regulations") from 1832 brought, through simplified regulations and tariffs a significant rise for the navigation. But because of its shallows and rapids the river was considered one of the most dangerous in Germany. In 1836 the Neckarschiffergilde ("Neckar shipping guild") was dissolved, which had since 1810 tried to gain a monopoly on the Neckar trade. With the ratification of the Neckarschiffahrtsordnung in 1842 all Guilds were dissolved and thereby economic freedom created.

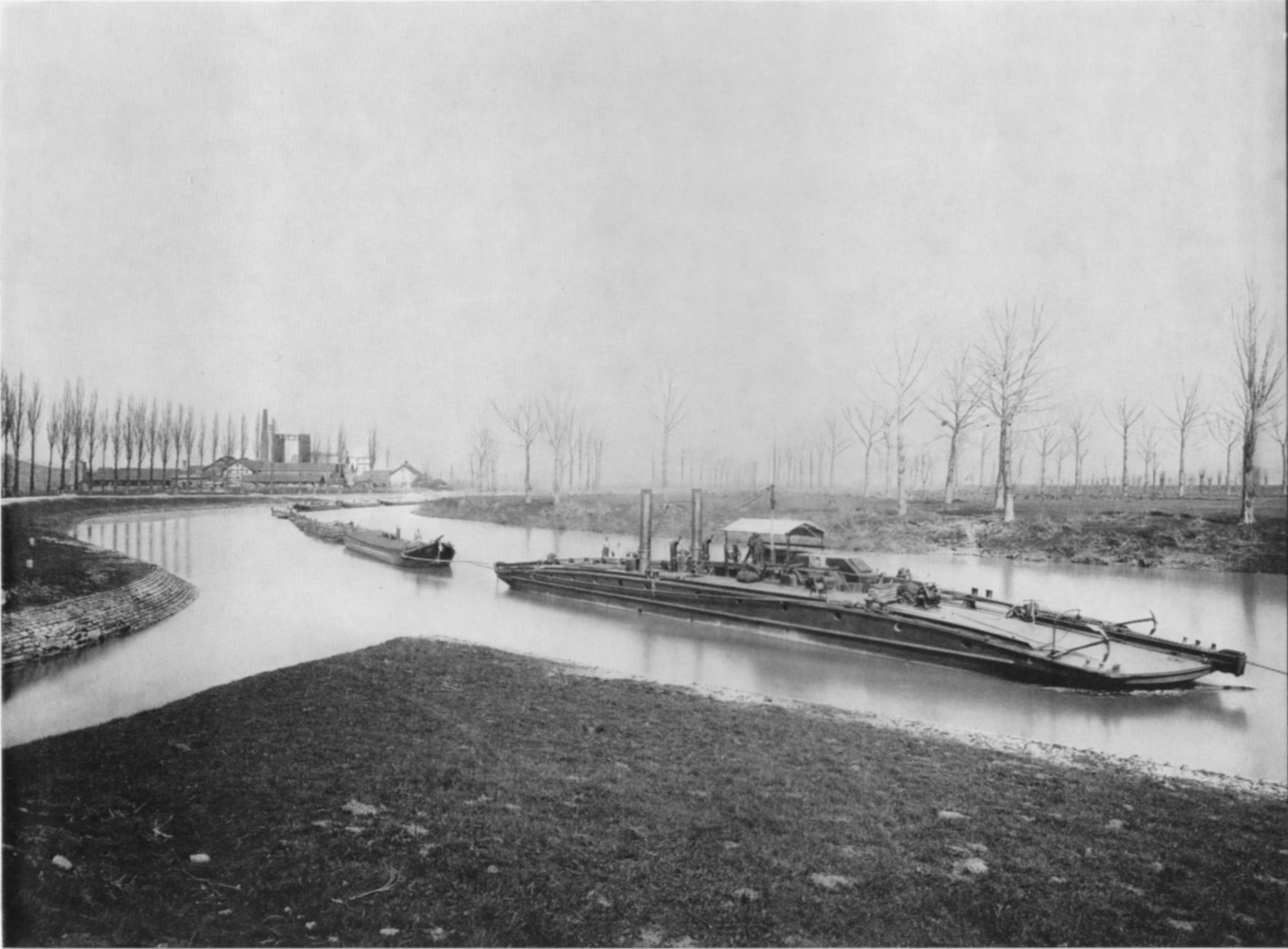
Chain Boat on the Neckar at Heilbronn

From 1841/42 onwards the Heilbronn-based Neckar-Dampfschifffahrt introduced a regular passenger and general cargo transport from Heilbronn to Mannheim. Despite the usage of modern steam ships, horses still pulled the heavy barges on the towpath upriver. The reason was that the steam ships were not yet strong enough herefore.

The competition of rail transport made steam ships as well as towing barges gradually uneconomic in the second half of the 19th century. Rafting on the other hand kept its importance, but adapted to the age of the railroad. Because trunks from the Black forest did more and more go by train to Heilbronn and only from there continued their trip on the water, a new rafting harbour was constructed in Heilbronn in 1875. Above Esslingen the rafting was only of little importance. The last raft passed the city on 28. Oktober 1899.

A new recovery for the Neckar navigation came with the chain boat navigation begun in 1878. Despite the construction of a railroad line along the Neckar. Between Mannheim and Heilbronn steam towboats with attached barges were now able to pull themselves upriver on a 115 km long chain which had been put into the river. Through that, the trip between Mannheim and Heilbronn was shortened to two to three days. On the horse drawn ships it had previously taken five to eight days. But often the water depth was not deep enough. The vernacular name for the chain boats was Neckaresel ("Neckar donkey"). The last chain boat navigation was still done 1933 – 1935 between Neckargerach and the barrage Kochendorf.

The world's first motorboat made during the summer of 1886 by Gottlieb Daimler and Wilhelm Maybach was named "Neckar" when their Standuhr (grandfather clock) petrol engine was tested on the river near Bad Cannstatt.

The motorized cargo navigation began on the Neckar in 1925. The first motor cargo ship on the river was ordered by the brothers Ludwig (1887–1955) and Jakob Götz (1890–1977) already in 1924 at the Anderssen Werft ("Anderssen shipyard"). It was put into service in 1925 and christened "Gebrüder Götz". The motor cargo ship was operated by the shipping company drove for the shipping company Ludwig und Jakob Götz, founded in 1920. One of the best known shipping companies on the Neckar, which was also involved in the upgrading of the river to a heavy shipping waterway.

In 1946 the first transportation order for coal after the Second World War on the Neckar was awarded and shipped by Johann Friedrich Boßler with his motor cargo ship Elisabeth.

==== Upgrading to a heavy shipping waterway between 1921 and 1968 ====
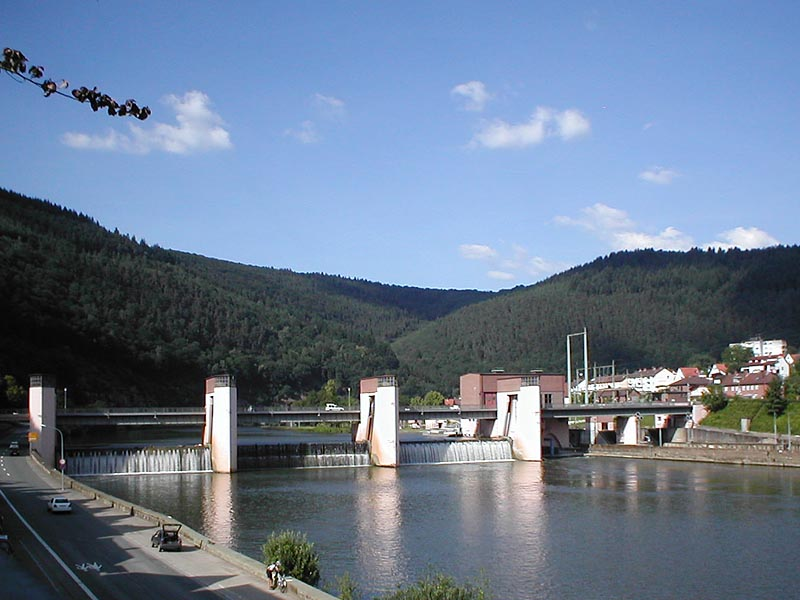
Neckar-Staustufe Hirschhorn with weir and double barrage

In order to provide the rising industrial area around Stuttgart a waterway connection for fully rigged ships, first plannings for channelling of the Neckar between Mannheim and Plochingen began already in 1904. The goal was to be mostly independent from natural impacts as for example low waters or floating ice. With the Württembergian side Otto Konz (1875–1965) was assigned who remained connected to the Neckar upgrading the rest of his life. A memorandum from 1910 allowed for ships up to 1000 tons, according to plans from 1919 the transportation was planned for the 1200-t-ship.

Because the Neckar was earmarked as a Reichswasserstraße (literally:"realm waterway") in the Weimar Constitution in 1919 (officially from 1. April 1921), Neckarbaudirektion (literally: "Neckar construction department") was introduced in 1920 whose head Otto Konz became. The department was directly subordinated to the German Reich (often called "Weimar Republic"). In 1921 the German Reich, the Neckar adjoining states Württemberg, Baden and Hessen agreed in a state treaty the upgrading of the Neckar to a heavy shipping waterway. In order to finance the construction project they founded the Neckar AG with a construction loan from the German Reich, the three States and several municipalities in the same year. As compensation the AG received the right to use the simultaneously expanded hydropower until 2034 and to redeem the construction loan with the profits; this right transferred to the Federal Republic of Germany. As chairman of the Neckar AG were elected Otto Hirsch from the Württembergian ministry of internal affairs and Otto Konz. In consideration of the world famous cityscape of Heidelberg and in order to bring the further barrages in unison with nature and landscape, the architect Paul Bonatz worked for the project (1877–1956).

Construction began immediately along the entire distance in 1921. Along a stretch of 113 km length the first eleven barrages between Mannheim and the new canal harbour in Heilbronn were finished in 1935. This canal harbour became later through the further expansion the barrage channel Heilbronn.

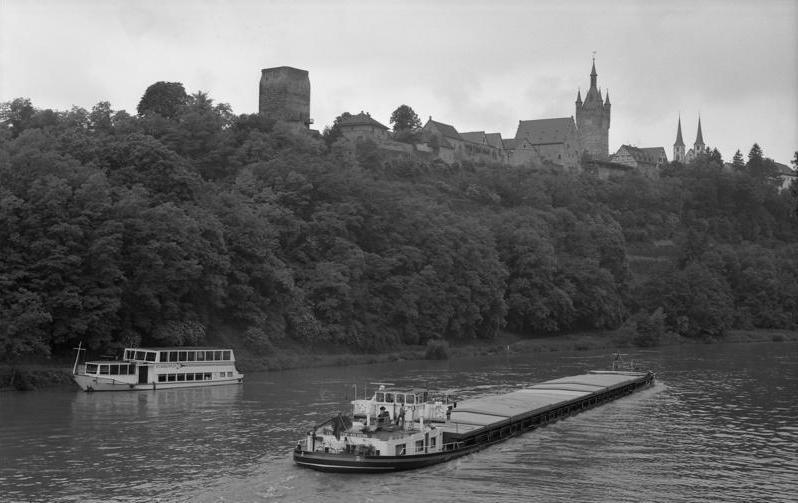
Navigation on the Neckar near Bad Wimpfen in 1988 with the passenger ship Neckarbummler of the Personenschifffahrt Stumpf

The expansion of the Neckar to a heavy shipping waterway lead to a shipbuilding industry exclusively for the passenger traffic on the river. Already in 1926 the brothers Georg (1881–1946) and Andreas Boßler (1884–1961) founded the Personenschiffahrt Gebr. Bossler, which makes the Gebrüder Bossler pioneers for passenger navigation on the Neckar.

While the river was upgraded and the barrages constructed, the Neckar-Enz-Stellung, a defensive fortification against enemies approaching from the West was constructed between 1935 and 1938. It was based between Eberbach and Besigheim on the natural obstacle of the Neckar river and from thereon followed the Enz upriver up to Enzweihingen.

Upgrading works were begun near Plochingen at the upper end of the intended waterway and plans existed to make the Fils between Plochingen and Göppingen navigable. The area for a harbour in Göppingen remained reserved in spatial planning until 1978. The construction chairman Konz also ordered the planning of a tunnel through the Swabian Jura for a waterway Ulm at the Danube in order to create a waterway between upper Rhine and upper Danube, as the State treaty from 1921 had planned. But those plans were dropped from 1968 onwards.

After 1935 the upgrading slowed down. Until 1943 only six barrages above Heilbronn were constructed, but without locks. Hirsch was forced out of office and murdered in the KZ Mauthausen in 1941. Konz went into provisional retirement because of national socialist repressions. The constructions were mostly stopped during the second world war. Only in 1948 the barrage construction above Heilbronn was continued, until 1952 again led by Otto Konz. The section up to Stuttgart was finished in 1958 and Stuttgart harbour was opened by the president Theodor Heuß together with Otto Konz. With the opening of the Plochingen harbour in 1968 the expansion goal for the Neckar was reached after 47 years of construction. The river was dammed up at 27 locks and thereby had become a heavy shipping waterway from Mannheim to Plochingen.

Every barrage consists of a weir with two to six openings and different gates, a double lock and a remote-controlled hydropower plant next to each other. At seven barrages, where a larger damming up was not possible due to the landscape, a parallel barrage and hydropower canal varying in length from 1.5 to 7.5 km has been constructed. At two further barrages a breakthrough exists which cuts of a river bend. In total only 17% of the entire distance from the Rhine up to the mouth of the Rems lie in an artificial waterbed, which means the river character dominates. On the last 32 km of the waterway in the area of the less water carrying upper river which is at the same time heavily used economically, almost the entire river bed had to be constructed artificially.

=== Today ===
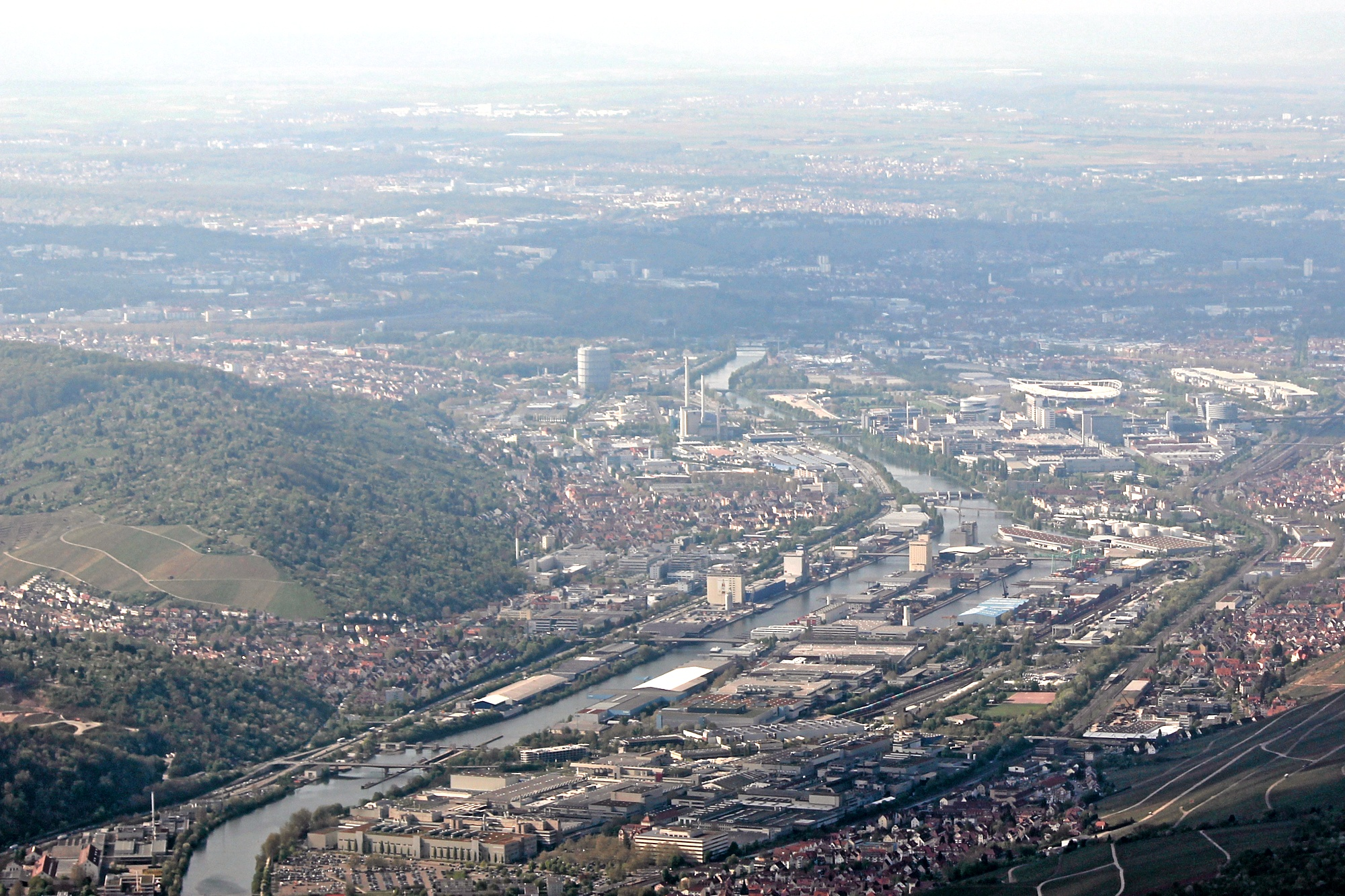
Neckar river course near Stuttgart-Untertürkheim through heavily industrialized area

The Neckar (Ne) is being administered after taking over step-by-step from the Neckar AG since 1970 from Mannheim to Plochingen as a Bundeswasserstraße (literally "federal waterway") by the water- and navigation offices Stuttgart and Heidelberg. The Federal Republic is owner of the waterway. Sport boats including paddle and rowing boats are subject to the Binnenschifffahrtsstraßen-Ordnung, valid on the Neckar which for example defines the need of identification and the rules for the right of way. 159 water abstraction points and 628 water intakes show the heavy water economical usage.

On the Neckar, which is nowadays classified as a "Wasserstraße des Typs Va" (waterway Type Va) from km 201.5 at Plochingen to its mouth (km 0), 7332 river boats transported in 2012 7.5 million tons. The largest parts of these tons were made up of construction material (1,9 Millionen t) and coal (1,6 Millionen t) as well as salt (1,3 Millionen t). 21.000 TEU Containers were transported. Leisure ships run by various companies travel on the river for tourists. On the upper Neckar the passenger navigation is handled by the company Neckar-Käpt'n.

=== Harbour ===
==== Plochingen harbour ====
On December 8, 1954, the Neckarhafen Plochingen GmbH was founded. From 1960 until 1963 the last barrage was constructed near Deizisau. The construction of the Neckarhafen Plochingen started on April 29, 1964. The first ship landed in Plochingen on July 12, 1968, after it had been blessed with the name "Plochingen" by Gertrud Hartung, the mayor's wife. In the harbour 15 companies generated an annual revenue of about 500 to 600 million euro in 2004.

==== Stuttgart harbour ====
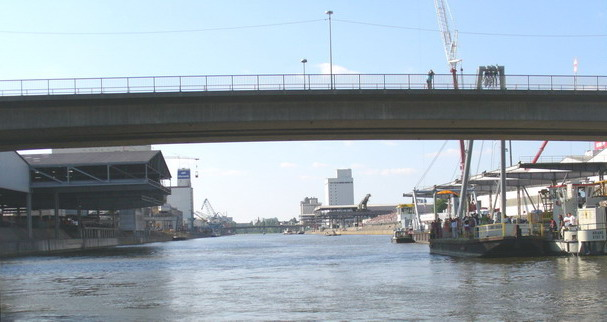
Stuttgart's Neckarhafen

The Neckarhafen Stuttgart was constructed in two steps, from 1954 until 1958 and from 1966 until 1968. The harbour area covers a total area of 100 ha. The three basins including the federal waterway have a water surface of 30,7 ha.

==== Cannstatt harbour ====
The first Cannstatter "Hafen am Mühlgrün" was inaugurated by duke Eberhard Louis in 1713. It remained insignificant.

==== Heilbronn harbour ====
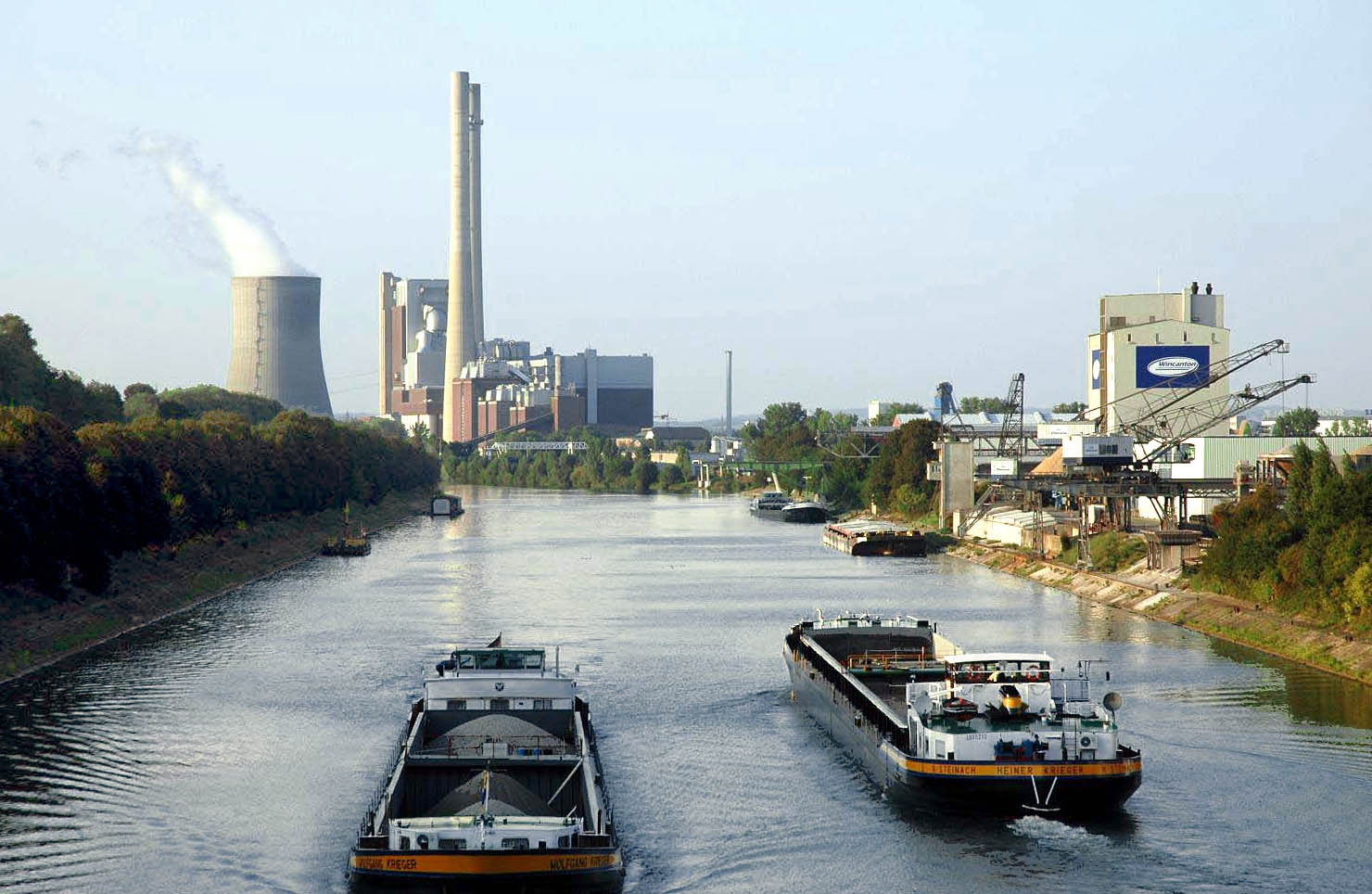
Heilbronn canal port with shipping traffic by the freight motor ships Wolfgang Krieger and Heiner Krieger of the shipping company Gebr. Krieger

The Heilbronn harbour with a total factory area of 78 ha and a quay length of 7,2 km based on the turnover the 7th largest inland harbour in Germany (2010) and the largest of the Neckar. Over 50% of the Neckar turnover is done here. In total about 4 million tons per year. About 60% of the turnover are domestic trade, the rest are international goods and commodities. Additionally to commodities and construction material (coal, Salt) grain, iron, steel and timber are loaded.

==== Mannheim harbour ====
The Mannheim harbour is one of the most important inland harbours in Europe and the second-largest in Germany. The harbour has a total water surface of 267,9 ha, additionally there is 863,5 ha land area. About 500 companies with 20.000 employees have settled in the harbour area. In 1968 the first Container-Terminal in an inland harbour was opened here. Furthermore, a RoRo-facility and since 1991 a combined transport terminal. On the water side 7.64 million tons of goods were turned over in 2010. The largest stakes have bituminous coal 2.2 million t, food- and fodder with 0.92 million t and chemical goods with 1.59 million t. At the container terminal on the water side 120.568 units were turned over.

The harbour basin spreads out around the mouth of the Neckar along the Rhine and Neckar. The overall complex includes the Ludwigshafener Rheinhafen, which is situated directly on the opposite side of the Rhine river.

=== Barrages ===
The maximum size of the river boats driving on the Neckar is limited by the locks of the 27 barrages. Those are in general 110 m long and 12 m wide; the allowed dimensions are therefore 105 m x 11.45 m. Since 1952 almost every Barrage got a second lock. Twenty-three of those locks use almost 50% of the water of one chamber to fill the other empty chamber in order to save water (so-called twin locks). In order to prevent jams at the mouth of the Neckar, the first barrage Feudenheim received a further lock in 1973 (190 m × 12 m). The barrages have an average distance of 7 km between each other (between 0.9 and 13.7 km, see table) and are used to cover the difference in altitude of 160.70 m to the Rhine at low water. The waterway depth is since 2000 continuously 3.80 m. This means that the Stuttgart harbour can be reached by the large motor ships of the Rhine, which have a draft of 2.6 m and a loading capacity of 2200 t. In the coming years it is planned to refurbish the locks and partly extend them. In total the federal government invests 575 Million Euro for this project. For its execution, the Amt für Neckarausbau Heidelberg was founded in 2007. In order to make the Neckar navigable for 135 m long ships, one of each dual lock chamber is going to be lengthened. Furthermore, the old chambers are going to be refurbished and certain sections and turn around spots expanded. The barrages between Mannheim and Heilbronn are supposed to be lengthened until 2026. The Gundelsheim lock received the title "most water sport friendly lock" in 2012.

Table of the locks at the Neckar with river kilometers and aimed stowage height in meters above Normalnull (NN) and difference in level (de) in meters.

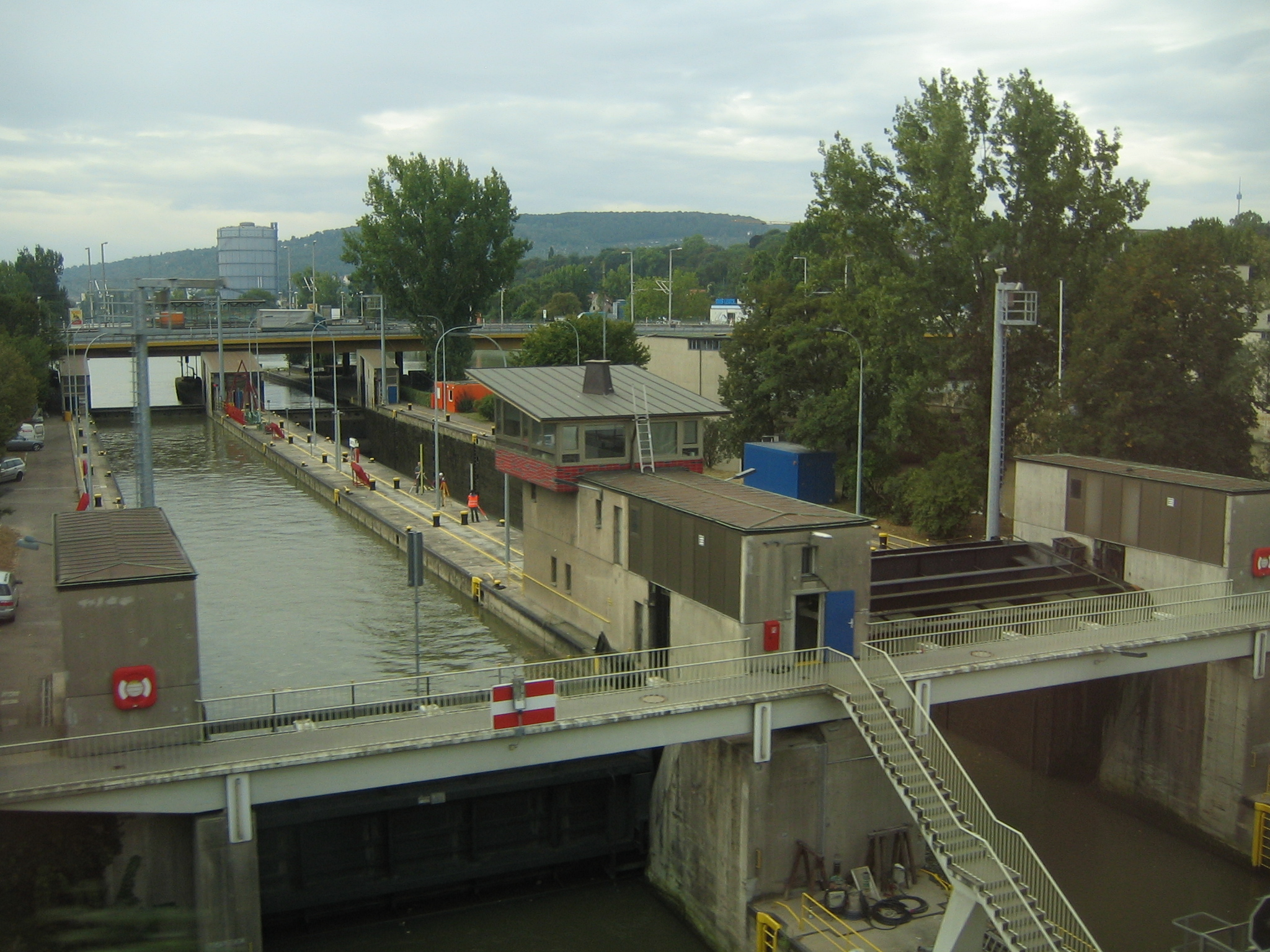
The Cannstatt double lock

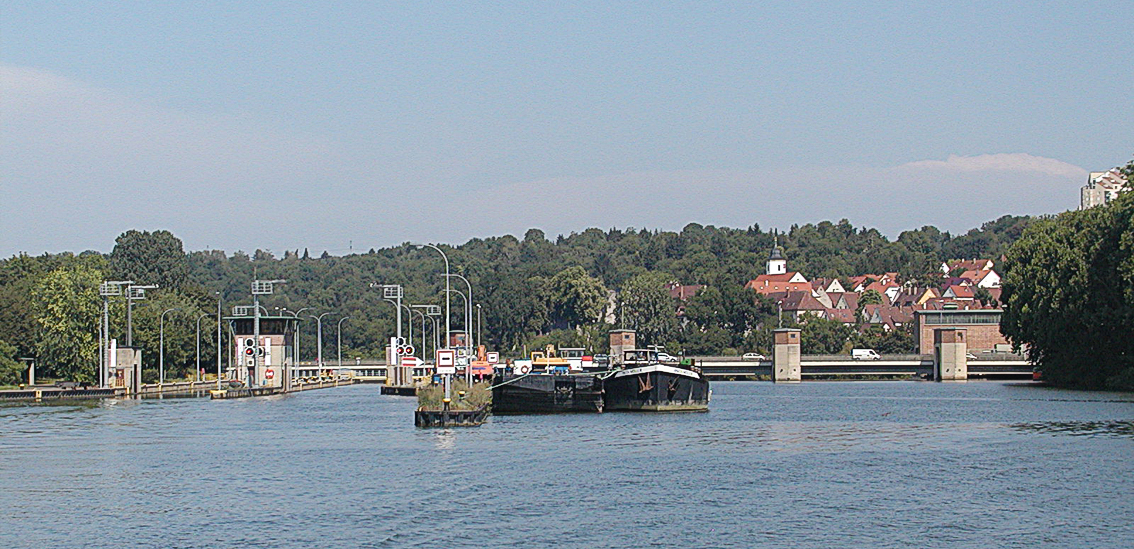
The Hofen barrage

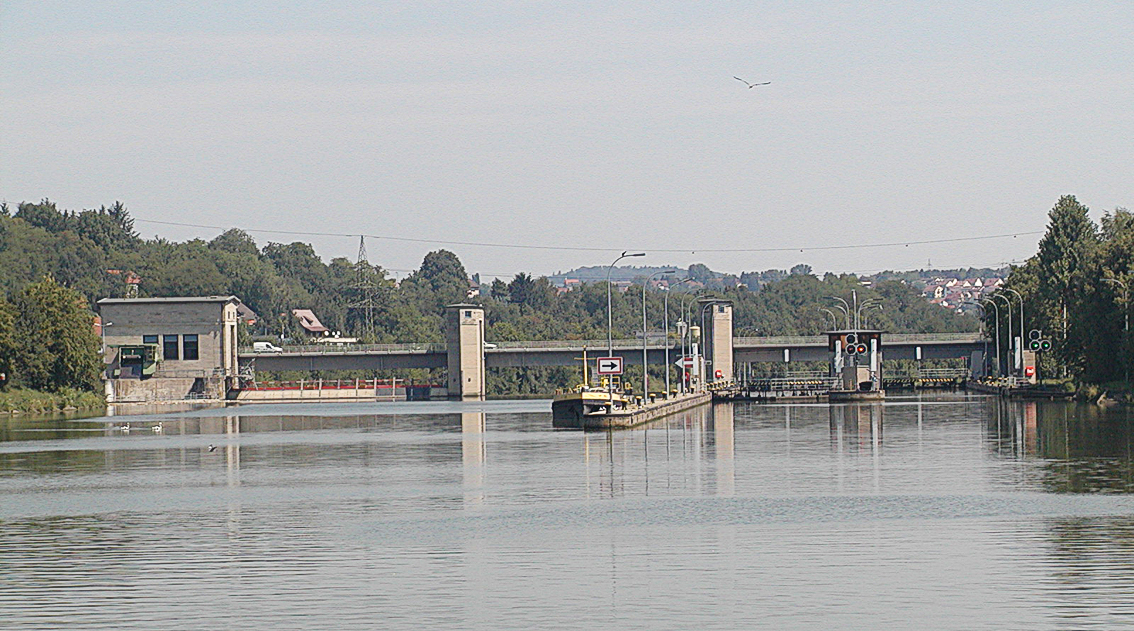
The Aldingen barrage

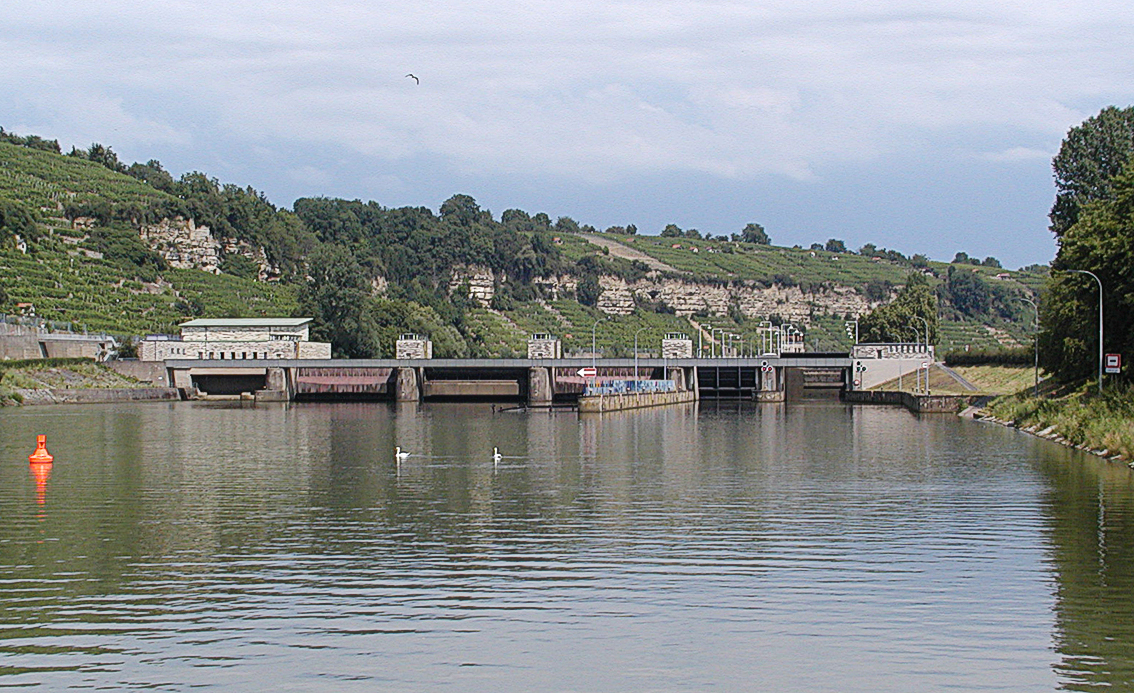
The Poppenweiler barrage

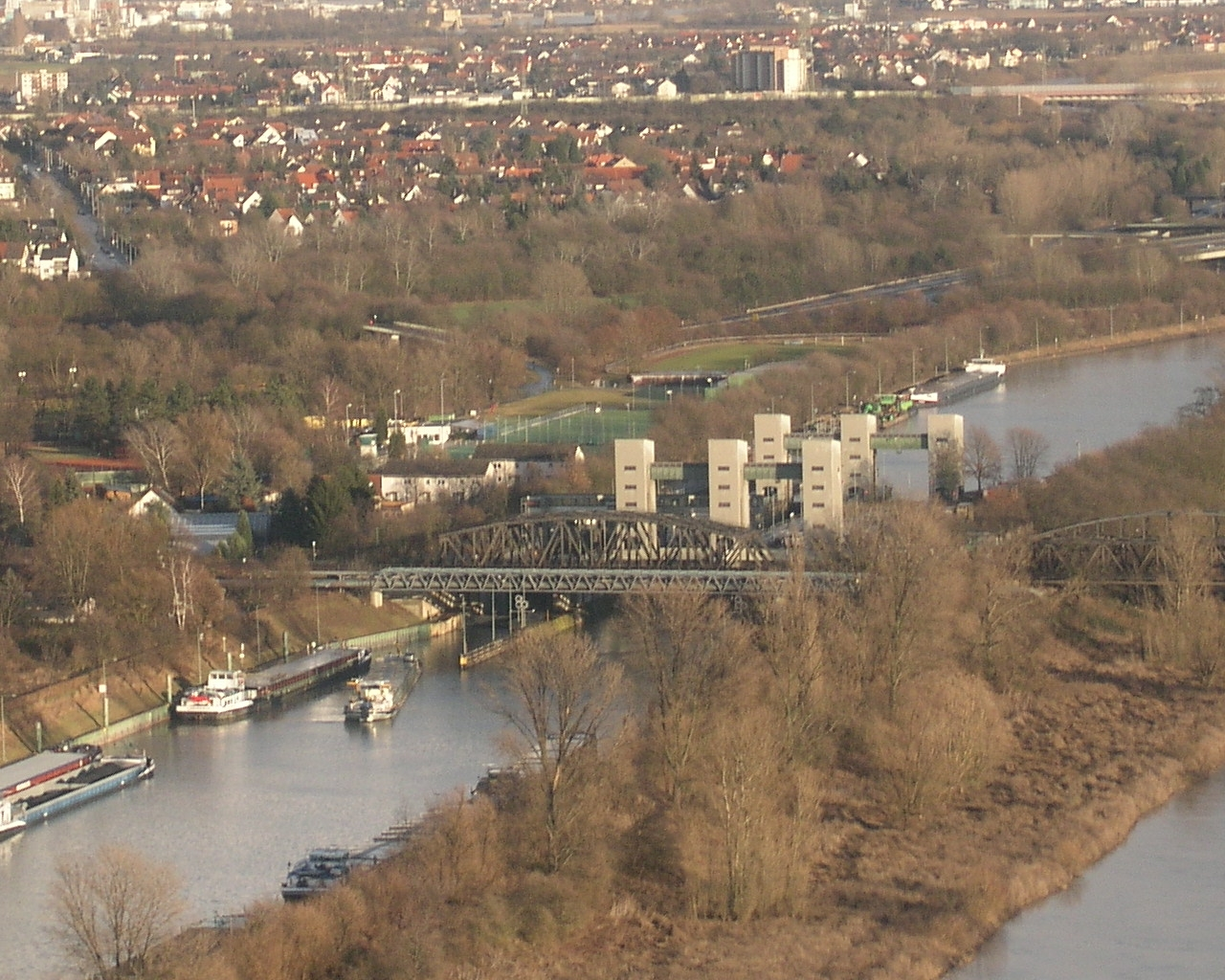
The Feudenheim lock

In contrast to other waterways, as for example the Mosel or Main, there are no boat locks except for Bad Cannstatt. Therefore, yachts and sailing boats are normally locked in the river boat locks. The rails installed at the other 26 barrages to pull boats from one side to the other are often in a bad condition or even unusable. In some places canoes can, if allowed by the locks staff, use the lock as well. This is especially used on group trips.

Since 2004 the remote control center in Stuttgart-Obertürkheim (Fernbedienzentrale, FBZ) controls all locks from Deizisau to Stuttgart-Hofen on the upper Neckar.

=== Stream gauge and flood ===
Crucial for the professional and recreational navigation on the Neckar are its stream gauges. According to the Hochwassermeldeordnung (HMO, flood report regulation) of the State Baden-Württemberg the following Hochwassermeldehöhen are valid at the stream gauge:

Gauge	Water level	Drainage	Telephone number
Rottweil	230 cm	77m^{3}/s	0741-8730
Horb	270 cm	108 m^{3}/s	07451-19700
Kirchentellinsfurt	330 cm	–	07121-19700
Plochingen	300 cm	290 m^{3}/s	07153-19429
Lauffen	500 cm	600 m^{3}/s	07133-19429
Gundelsheim	340 cm	–	06269-19429

Gauge Plochingen

The gauge in Plochingen (since 1905) was the only gauge at the waterway that lay in free descent. In 1962 the moveable barrage in Deizisau was constructed. In order to keep water level differences caused by the barrage, a ridge was constructed about 100 m below the Plochingen street bridge and moved the gauge there. The large flood in February 1970 destroyed the ridge made of stones. Because the costs for a new ridge made out of concrete seemed to be too high, a more economic solution was found. Out of the stream gauges and discharge of the gauges in Wendlingen (Neckar-km 206,5 – for the upper Neckar) and Reichenbach (Fils-km 2,5 – for the Fils) water gauges and discharges are algorithmically calculated and published.

Flood

The most serious flood in the Neckar area happened in October 1824. Estimates conclude for a HQ_{4000}, that means a return period of 4000 years. A study has been done to clustering simultaneous occurrences of the Extreme Floods in the Neckar Catchment and the results shows the Neckar catchment has been divided into three major clusters. The first cluster mainly covers the western part and is bounded by the Black Forest and Swabian Alps. The second cluster is mostly located in the eastern part of the upper Neckar. The third cluster contains the remaining lowland areas of the Neckar basin

=== Freeze up ===
In 1709, from January 18 until January 28 and from January 31 until February 13 as well as shortly after February 13 until March 23 the Neckar was frozen up.

== Structures ==
=== Mills ===
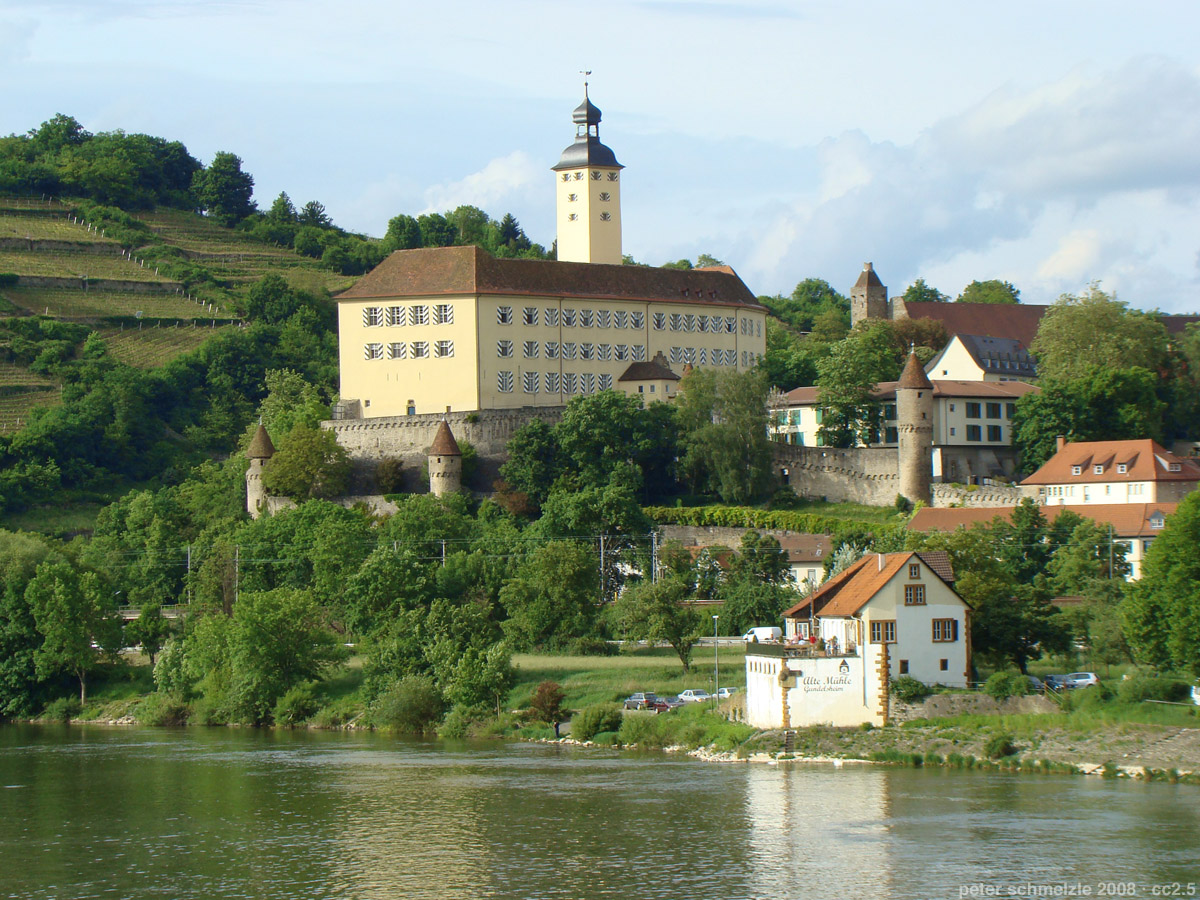
Old Neckar mill below Horneck Castle in Gundelsheim

The hydropower of the Neckar drove numerous mills, of which some are surviving to today:

- In Rottweil a powder mill existed since the 15th century which merged to the Powder factory Rottweil in 1863.
- In Gundelsheim the building of the Alten Neckarmühle (old Neckar mill) dates back to 1604. The milling was stopped following the Neckar regulation. The last miller was Meister Batz around 1935/36. There is no equipment in place anymore, for a time it was used gastronomically. Worth seeing are a large stone with a coat of arms and old inscriptions.

=== Power stations ===
At least since the early 20th century, power stations replaced the historical mills. Since then the Neckar has been used for commercial electricity production through hydroelectric power. Several transregionally known hydro plants can be found at the Neckar:

- In Horb the construction of a hydroelectric plant was begun at the island front at the level of the Schillerstraße in February 2010. It started producing electricity on April 13, 2011. The hydroelectric plant is expected to produce 2.3 kWh yearly in the future – enough in order to supply about 600 four-person households with electricity. Together with the already existing, refurbished facilities it has an average total power of 437 kW. The total investments were about 5.5 million Euro.
- In Rottenburg's Bad Niedernau district, the Wasserkraftwerk Bad Niedernau can be found.
- In Rottenburg am Neckar the two power plants Beim Preußischen and Tübinger Straße.

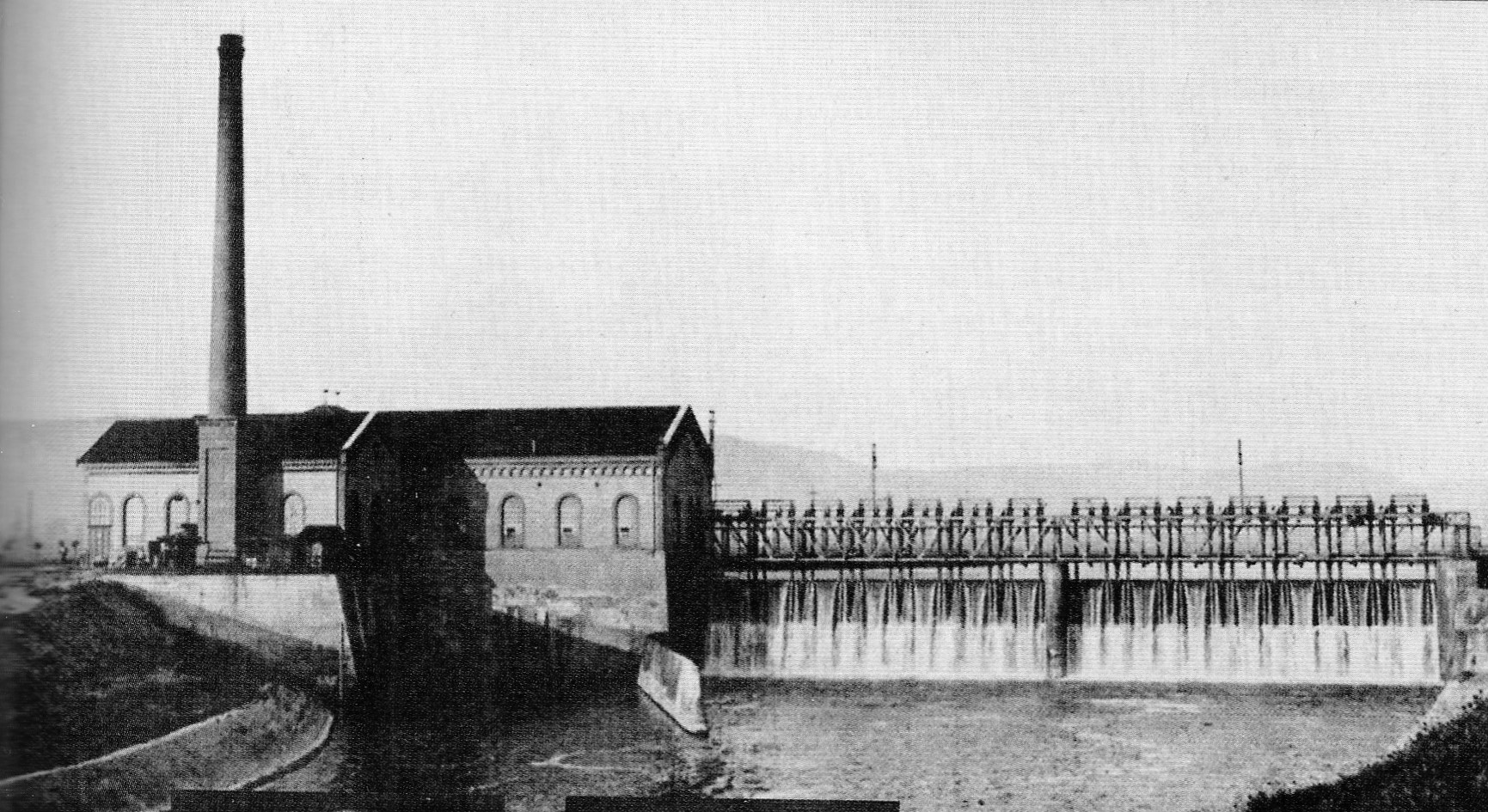
Kombiniertes Wasser –a coal-fired power station in Kiebingen 1910

- In Kiebingen the Rottenburger clock factory Junghans did run since 1903 their own power plant, which still produces electricity today. For the clock factory the plant run by water and steam was over-dimensioned, therefore the overproduction was sold. Today the historic powerhouse is under monumental protection. Despite its age, the power plant is a very modern plant with three characteristics: The turbines have an innovative scoop shape which has been developed with computer simulations, special Thordon-Turbine bearings and inflatable rubber dam. A fish pass recreates since the modernization the pervasiveness for fish migration at the weir.
- The hydroelectric plant Tübingen-Hirschau is located between Hirschau and Tübingen as well as the Wasserkraftwerk Rappenberghalde which was constructed in 1930. It was refurbished in 1999 and today the two Kaplan turbines produce together with the residual water turbine at the weir upstream in Hirschau 7 million kWh electricity per year. More than 22 cubic metres of water per second flow through a 1.7 km long supply canal to the plant. The plant uses the incline of the Neckar of 7.5 meters.

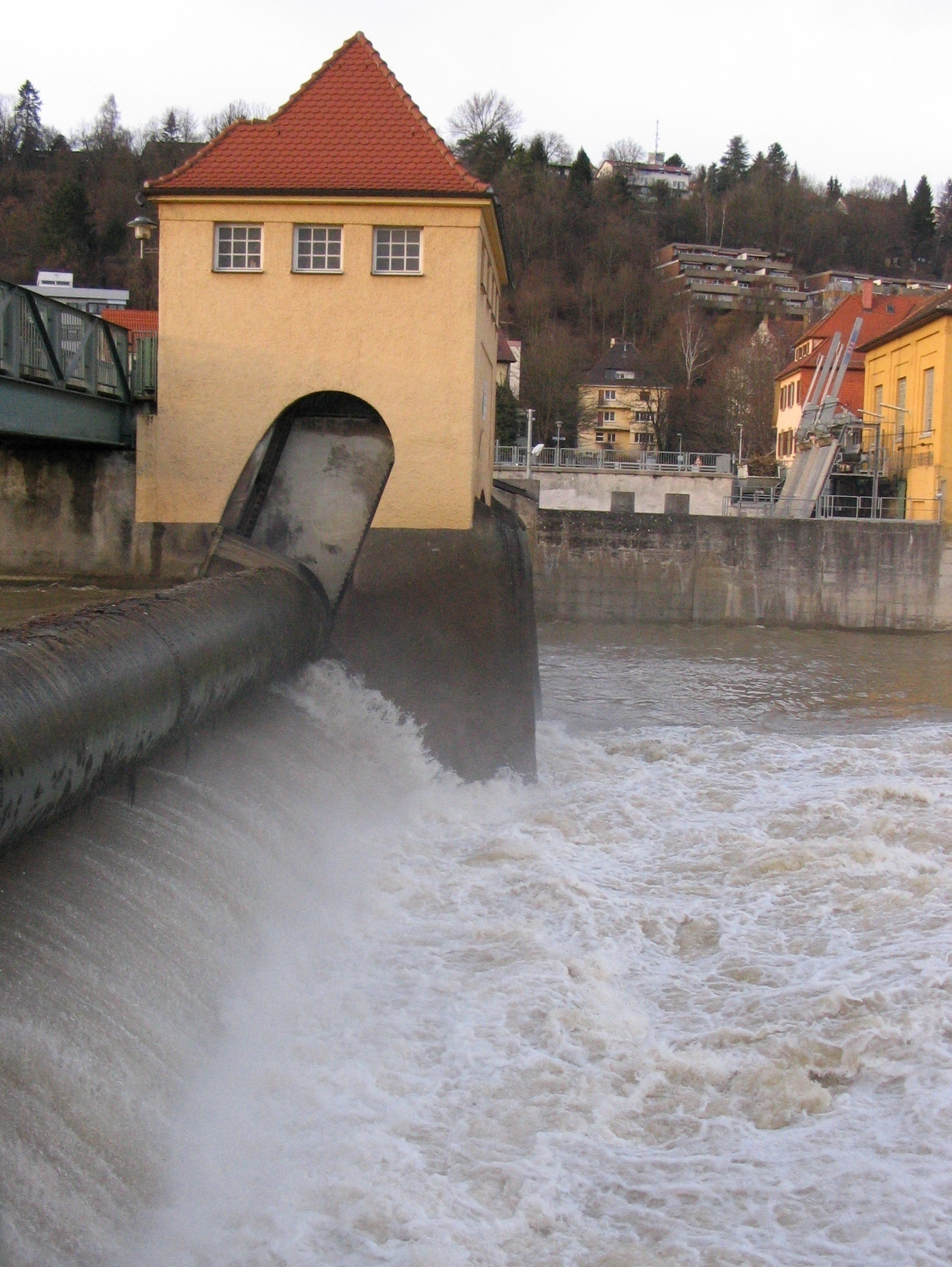
Tübingen

- The Wasserkraftwerk Neckarwerk in Tübingen was constructed together with the weir within the frame of the Neckar regulation as one of the first roller dams in Germany in 1910/1911. It is used for electricity generation as well as control of the river. Through the weir the water level of the Neckar in Tübingen center is managed. Before the construction of the weir the Neckar was full of gravel banks and hat a very flat waterfront. This can be seen on many photographs and drawings prior to the construction. Moreover, floods, which now and then flooded the few buildings in Wöhrd and sometimes threatened the Neckar bridge, have been eliminated with this weir and the other weirs (e.g. in Rottenburg). For fish a fish ladder has been constructed later on. The pedestrian bridge over the weir is an important connection of the two waterfronts between Lustnau and the central Eberhards or Neckar bridge. It also provides a nice view of Neckar, the historic city center, abbey church and castle.

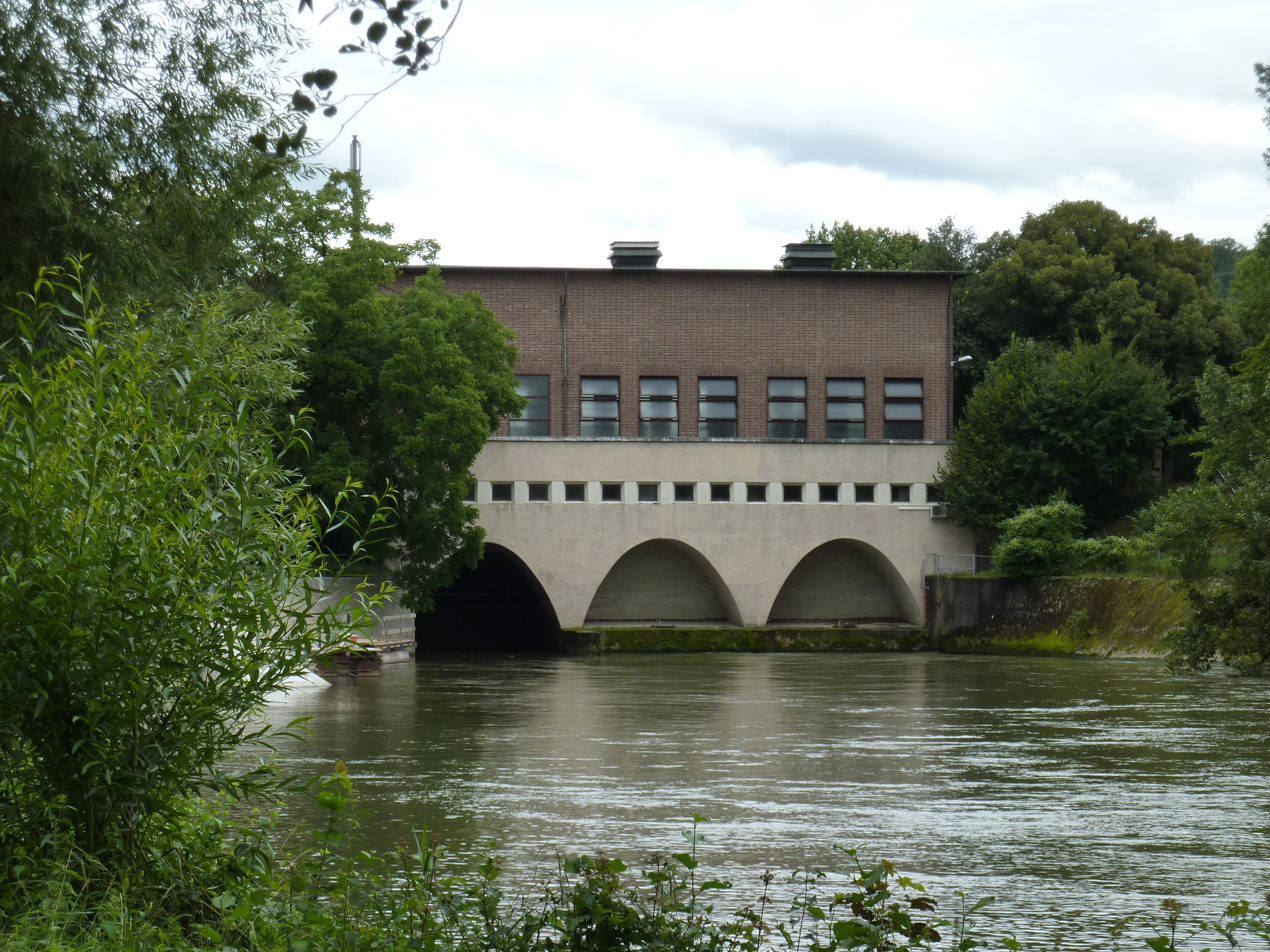
The Oberesslingen power plant

- The Kraftwerk Oberesslingen is a run-of-the-river hydroelectricity plant between two Neckar islands at river kilometer 195.6 in Oberesslingen. The plant was constructed in 1929 during the upgrading to a heavy waterway according to a design made by the architect Paul Bonatz. It has a capacity of 2.1 MW and delivers per year about 12.3 GWh energy. The average flow is 45 cubic meters per second.
- In Esslingen a new run-of-the-river hydroelectricity plant has been constructed on the Hechtkopf. With a capacity of 1.25 MW and a yearly electricity production of 7.1 GWh, 4000 people can be supplied with electricity. With the construction of this new power plant the last of the barrages on the Neckar has been equipped with turbines. It is framed by a weir in the Neckar on one side and the historical bridge house over the Hammerkanal (hammer canal) on the other side.

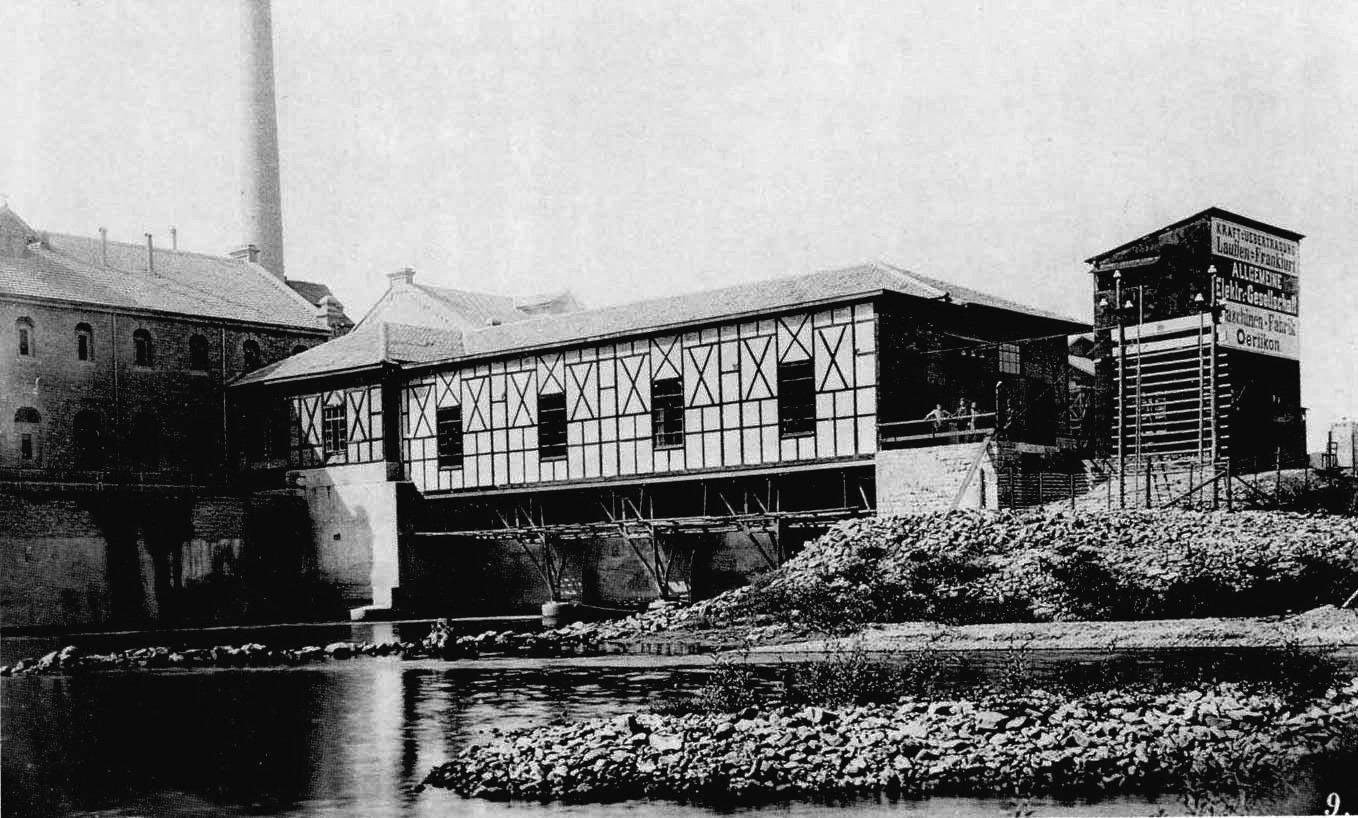
The power station of Lauffen am Neckar in 1891

- The Drehstromübertragung Lauffen–Frankfurt was on August 25, 1891, the worldwide first transmission of electric energy with high voltage alternating three-phase current. On the occasion of the International Electrotechnical Exhibition 1891 the electricity generated by the hydropower plant at the Mühlgraben in Lauffen am Neckar was upvolted to 15 kV and transported over 175 km to Frankfurt am Main where it ran an artificial waterfall. The power plant was moved up river during the upgrading of the Neckar. The original generator is now located in the Deutschen Museum (German Museum) in Munich.
- The hydropower plant Heilbronn lies on the old Neckar in the city center and not on the canal. Therefore, no lock exists here.

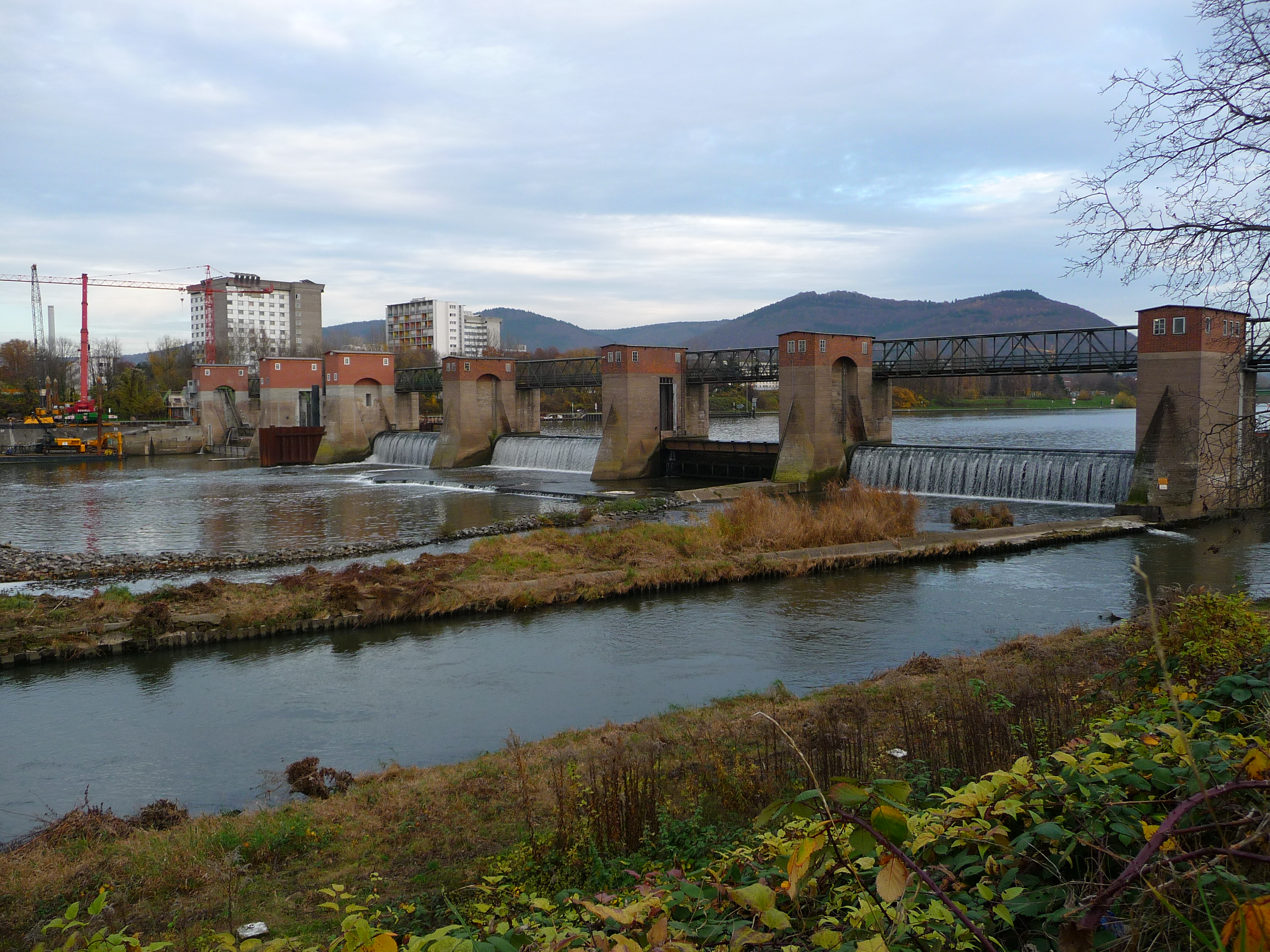
Weir footbridge over the Neckar at the Wieblingen weir in Heidelberg (built 1925)

- At the Heidelberger Karlstor is another barrage with locks; the corresponding power plant is the only underwater hydropower plant on the Neckar. The construction permission Neckar AG 1994 received in 1994 had a number of requirements. Neither were visible changes at the weir that is under monumental protection, nor should the new power plant change the historic cityscape of Heidelberg. The technical solution was a power plant embedded invisibly under the riverbed.
- At the weir in Heidelberg the weir bridge connects the city districts Wieblingen and Neuenheim.

Additionally, the Neckar is and has been a cooling water supply for coal and nuclear power plants. Near Esslingen-Zell the Neckar cools the Altbach Power Station, one of the most modern bituminous coal power plants in Europe. It consists of two blocks and is located in the area of the two municipalities Altbach and Deizisau. With its gas turbines and the combination block 4, it can produce a maximum of about 1270 MW of electrical power.

The Heizkraftwerk Stuttgart-Gaisburg, the incineration facility of the Kraftwerks Stuttgart-Münster, the Kraftwerk Marbach, the Kraftwerk Walheim, the Neckarwestheim Nuclear Power Station, the Kraftwerk Heilbronn and the mothballed Obrigheim Nuclear Power Plant source their cooling or evaporation water from the Neckar as well.

=== Bridges ===
Famous bridges include the Neckar Valley Bridge Weitingen, near the town Horb am Neckar and the Old Bridge, in Heidelberg.

The ladder is amongst the best known historic bridges. It already existed in the High Middle Ages and was erected in today's form in 1788. Further historic Neckar bridges are the Neckarbrücke in Lauffen am Neckar, in the core dating back to 1532, the Neckar bridge in Sulz constructed in 1742, the Pliensaubrücke, the Alte Agnesbrücke (old Agnes bridge) and the Ulrichsbrücke in Köngen. The oldest still remaining Neckar bridge is the Innere Brücke in Esslingen. The 230-meter-long construction was built in the 13th century and consists of eleven stone arches.

The Neckartalbrücke Heilbronn is with 1348 meter the longest Neckarbridge. The prestressed concrete construction built in 1967 is ailing and since early 2018 being replaced by a new bridge.

In Neckargröningen the 85-meter longest free spanning wooden pedestrian bridge was created in 1990. The unusual structure has a triangle profile. Die älteste Spannbeton-Eisenbahnbrücke Deutschlands – erbaut 1957 – steht in Heilbronn.

In 1905, there were already 119 bridges over the Neckar, of which, with a total length of 230 meters, the longest was the Neckargartacher Neckarbrücke built between 1903 and 1905. In 1985 the heavy waterway was crossed by 159 railroad, street and pedestrian bridges and also by 126 overhead power lines and 67 Düker. In total, there are about 400 Neckar bridges of various sizes, half of them on the upper and half on the middle and lower reaches.

=== Castles and palaces ===
From Mannheim over Heidelberg, Eberbach, Mosbach up to Heilbronn the Castle Road runs almost parallel to the Neckar and passes on this about 100 km long section of the lower Neckar numerous castles and palaces. Most notably the Heidelberg Castle. Among the Neckar castles are also the four castles in Neckarsteinach, Dilsberg Castle, Burg Eberbach, Burg Hirschhorn, Zwingenberg Castle, Burg Stolzeneck, the Minneburg, Burg Dauchstein, Schloss Neuburg (Baden), the Hornberg Castle (the castle of Götz von Berlichingen) and the Guttenberg Castle (Deutsche Greifenwarte), Horneck Castle, and Burg Ehrenberg.

In the further course upriver to Stuttgart and continuing on, on the upper Neckar stand the Burg Horkheim and the Neippergsche Schloss Klingenberg, Schloss Lichtenegg, the Esslinger Burg, Burg Remseck, Schloss Liebenstein, the Weiler Burg, the Ruine Herrenzimmern, the Schloss Hohentübingen, the Schloss Weitenburg, the Ruine Albeck near Sulz am Neckar as well as the ruins Wehrstein and Neckarburg.

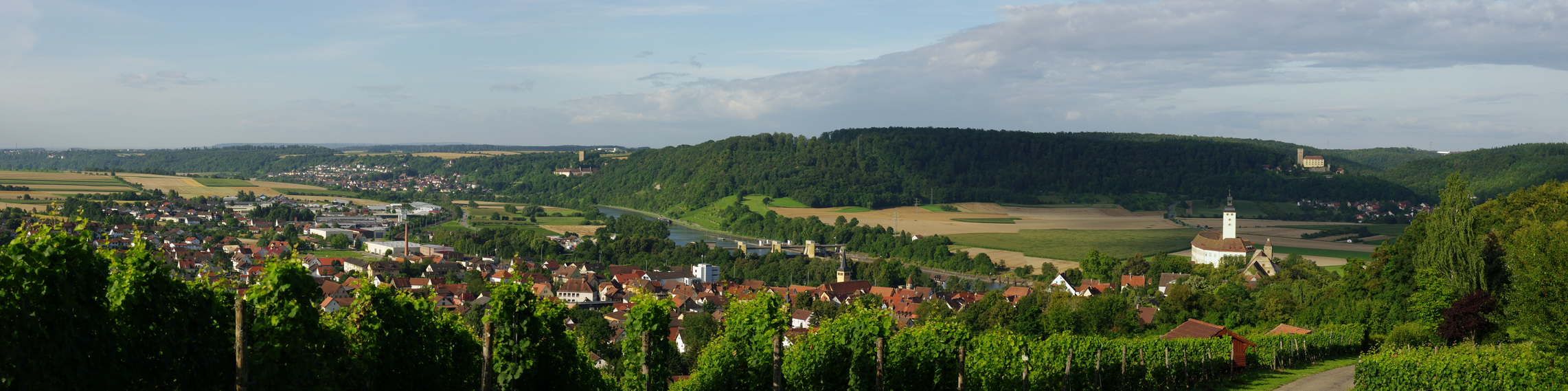
Valley of Neckar near Gundelsheim. On the right Horneck Castle in Gundelsheim, above in the background Guttenberg Castle above Neckarmühlbach. Left in the background, further downstream Burg Ehrenberg above Heinsheim.

=== Towers ===
- Rottweil Test Tower
- Fernmeldeturm Mannheim

== The Neckar in literature ==
Germany, in the summer, is the perfection of the beautiful, but nobody has understood, and realized, and enjoyed the utmost possibilities of this soft and peaceful beauty unless he has voyaged down the Neckar on a raft.

— Mark Twain, A Tramp Abroad

- Der Neckar poem by Friedrich Hölderlin
- Friedrich Hölderlin wrote a poem entitled "Der Neckar".
- The Neckar is mentioned prominently in Gustav Mahler's 1893 "Rheinlegendchen" ('Little Rhine Legend'), first published in 1899 in a cycle of 12 songs under the title Humoresken ('Humoresques'), today known as one of Mahler's Songs from Des Knaben Wunderhorn (Songs from The Youth's Magic Horn).

== Literature ==
- Hanns Heiman: Beiträge zur Geschichte des Neckarschiffergewerbes und der Neckarschiffahrt. Die Neckarschiffer Band 1, C. Winter's Universitätsbuchhandlung, Heidelberg 1907, (Digitalisat)
- Hanns Heiman: Die Lage der Neckarschiffer seit Einführung der Schleppschiffahrt. Die Neckarschiffer Band 2, C. Winter's Universitätsbuchhandlung, Heidelberg 1907, (Digitalisat)
- Jan Bürger: Der Neckar. Eine literarische Reise. C. H. Beck, München 2013, ISBN 978-3-406-64692-8.
- Der Neckar. Das Land und sein Fluss, hrsg. von der Landesanstalt für Umwelt, Messungen und Naturschutz Baden-Württemberg. Verlag Regionalkultur, Ubstadt-Weiher 2007, ISBN 978-3-89735-286-5.
- Franz X. Bogner: Das Land des Neckars. Thorbecke, Stuttgart 2004, ISBN 3-7995-0152-5.
- Walter Hailer (Hrsg.): Der Neckar – unser Lebensraum. Ministerium für Umwelt und Verkehr, Stuttgart; Geschäftsstelle IKoNE, Besigheim 2003.
- Jörg Bischoff, Norbert Kustos: Der Neckar von der Quelle bis zur Mündung. Ellert & Richter, Hamburg 2001, ISBN 3-89234-989-4 (Bildband).
- Hartmut Müller: Der Neckar. (= Literaturreisen). Ernst Klett Verlag, Stuttgart 1994, ISBN 3-12-895250-7.
- Helmut Betz: Historisches vom Strom Band. V – Die Neckarschiffahrt vom Treidelkahn zum Groß-Motorschiff, Krüpfganz, Duisburg 1989, ISBN 3-924999-04-X
- Wolf-Ingo Seidelmann (1988), Der Neckar-Donau-Kanal. 200 Jahre Planung für eine Wasserstrasse quer über die Alb, Beiträge zur südwestdeutschen Wirtschafts- und Sozialgeschichte 6 (in German), St. Katharinen: Scripta-Mercaturae-Verlag, ISBN 3-922661-41-6
- Andrea Wehr (Hrsg.): Neckar-Lesebuch. Geschichten und Gedichte dem Neckar entlang. Silberburg, Tübingen und Stuttgart 1994, ISBN 3-87407-198-7.
- Willi Zimmermann: Der Neckar. Schicksalsfluss der Stadt [Heilbronn]. Heilbronner Stimme, Heilbronn 1985, ISBN 3-921923-02-6.
- Willi Zimmermann: Heilbronn und sein Neckar im Lauf der Geschichte. In: Historischer Verein Heilbronn. 21. Veröffentlichung, Heilbronn 1954.
- Südwestdeutscher Kanalverein für Rhein, Donau und Neckar: Neckarkanal 1935, Verlag Julius Hoffmann ca. 1935, Broschur ca. 21 cm × 21 cm, 109 Seiten.
- Martin Eckoldt: Zur Gewässerkunde des kanalisierten Neckars, Mitteilung Nr. 62, Koblenz, 1955, Hrsg. Bundesanstalt für Gewässerkunde, Koblenz.
- Behrendt: Hydrologie am Neckar, aus Zeitschrift für Binnenschifffahrt und Wasserstrassen Nr. 9, 1973.
- M. Eckoldt (Hrsg.): Flüsse und Kanäle. Die Geschichte der deutschen Wasserstraßen. DSV-Verlag 1998
- Wasser- und Schifffahrtsdirektion Südwest: Kompendium der Wasser- und Schifffahrtsdirektion Südwest. Organisatorische und technische Daten, Binnenschifffahrt, Aufgaben, Wasserstraßen. Eigenverlag, Mainz Juni 2007

== Maps ==
- Landesvermessungsamt Baden-Württemberg: Freizeitkarte F513 Mannheim Heidelberg – Naturpark Neckartal-Odenwald (Westblatt). Stuttgart 2006, ISBN 3-89021-606-4.
- Landesvermessungsamt Baden-Württemberg: Freizeitkarte F514 Mosbach – Naturpark Neckartal-Odenwald (Ostblatt). Stuttgart 2006, ISBN 3-89021-607-2.
- Erhard Jübermann: Wassersport-Wanderkarten, Blatt 3, Deutschland-Südwest. Geocenter, 2004, ISBN 3-929540-13-4.
- Gerhard Römer (Hrsg.), Irene-Annette Bergs (Bearb.): Der Neckar in alten Landkarten. Ausstellungskatalog. Baden State Library, Karlsruhe 1988, ISBN 3-88705-022-3.
