= Kein schöner Land in dieser Zeit =

Popular German Volkslied

- Volkslied
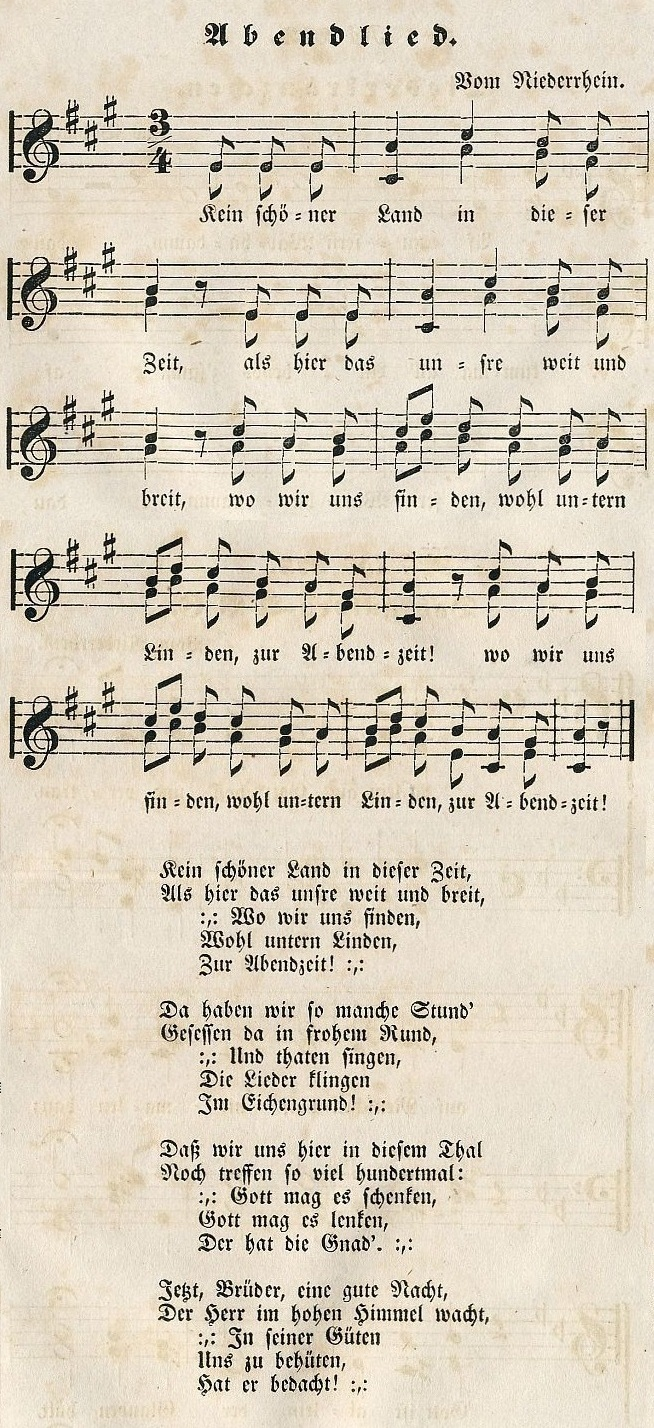
- Abendlied, first print in 1840
- English: No fairer land in this time
- Written: 1840
- Text: by Anton Wilhelm von Zuccalmaglio
- Melody: Anton Wilhelm von Zuccalmaglio
- Composed: 1840

"Kein schöner Land in dieser Zeit" (No fairer land in this time) is a popular Volkslied in German. It goes back to a song by Anton Wilhelm von Zuccalmaglio, first published in 1840 in a folk song collection. It gained popularity in the 1910s in the Wandervogel movement, and was later used by the Nazis and included in songbooks for the League of German Girls (German: Bund Deutscher Mädel). It has been set to choral music and modern songs. The beginning of the first line has been used as the title of books, a play and television series.

== History ==
In 1840, Anton Wilhelm von Zuccalmaglio published in the second volume of a collection of Volkslieder which was begun by Andreas Kretzschmer, entitled Deutsche Volkslieder mit ihren Original-Weisen (German folk songs with their original tunes), 382 songs which he collected himself, according to his preface. Some of the songs, however, were written and composed by Zuccalmaglio in the sense of a romantic Volkslied concept ("im Sinne eines romantischen Volksliedkonzeptes"). These include "Kein schöner Land in dieser Zeit", which he published under the title Abendlied (Evening Song) on page 494 as No. 274. It is marked as "Vom Niederrhein" (from Lower Rhenania), probably invented by the author.

After "Kein schöner Land" was included in the 1912 song book Unsere Lieder (Our Songs) of the Austrian Wandervogel, it gained popularity in the Wandervogel movement. This popularity resulted in several different text versions in the 1920s, such as a socialist version in 1929, and a version for Protestant girls and women. Eva Öhlke, a member of the Neuwerk-Bewegung, a Protestant youth movement, added a fifth stanza which became popular beyond the movement. The song has been included in most collections of songs in German.

The song, like many German folk songs expressing views of Germany as above or "fairer" than other countries, was included in Hitler Youth songbooks, and one songbook used the name of the song as its title. "Kein schöner Land in dieser Zeit" was the last song sung by the Hitler Youth in the evenings.

== Text ==
The poem's four stanzas are in five lines each, rhyming A–A–B–B–A. The song, speaking in the first person plural, celebrates the ideal of a gathering of friends on a summer evening in nature (Idealbild freundschaftlicher Zusammenkünfte an Sommerabenden in freier Natur), singing together. The singers express admiration of the beautiful land, and hope for similar gatherings in the future, God's grace permitting. They finally wish each other a good night under God's protection.

The melody consists of elements from various Volkslieder, such as "Ich kann und mag nicht fröhlich sein" and "Ade, mein Schatz, ich muss nun fort". The last three lines are repeated.

1. Kein schöner Land in dieser Zeit
als hier das unsre weit und breit,
wo wir uns finden
wohl untern Linden
zur Abendzeit.

2. Da haben wir so manche Stund
gesessen da in froher Rund
und taten singen,
die Lieder klingen
im Eichengrund.

3. Dass wir uns hier in diesem Tal
noch treffen so viel hundertmal,
Gott mag es schenken,
Gott mag es lenken,
er hat die Gnad.

4. Jetzt, Brüder, eine gute Nacht,
der Herr im hohen Himmel wacht;
in seiner Güten
uns zu behüten,
ist er bedacht!

1. There is no land, near and far,
more beautiful than ours at this time
when we gather
under the Linden trees
as night falls.

2. There we sat many hours
in a joyful circle
and sang,
the songs resound
in the oak grove.

3. May we meet again
in this valley many hundred times.
God may gift it,
God may grant it,
he has the grace.

4. Now brothers we wish you a good night,
the Lord up in Heaven is keeping watch.
In his goodness
he is prepared
to protect us.

== Adaptations ==
The melody was used in choral works such as Hans Lang's Kein schöner Land, a play for a two-part youth choir, Otto Jochum's An die Heimat: sein Werk beschauend., Op. 152, a suite of variations, and Hermann Erdlen's Kleine Hausmusik zum Singen und Spielen über das Volkslied "Kein schöner Land". The song was set for choirs often. Modern arrangements include Dieter Süverkrüp's "Ein schönes Land" (1963) and a version of the folk-rock group Ougenweide (1980).

The first line was used for song books, recording collections and television, including the series by Günter Wewel, Kein schöner Land about regions, and the political satire in six episodes Kein schöner Land directed by Klaus Emmerich after a script by Elke Heidenreich and Bernd Schroeder. Books with the title include the novel Kein schöner Land by Patrick Findeis, the play Kein schöner Land by Felix Mitterer, the nonfiction Kein schöner Land. Ein deutscher Umweltatlas, a German atlas of environment by Emanuel Eckardt, and Kein schöner Land. Die Zerstörung der sozialen Gerechtigkeit, about the destruction of social justice, by Heribert Prantl.
