= Hermann-Löns-Medaille =

German music prize

The Hermann-Löns-Medaille, awarded since 1974 in the categories platinum, gold, silver and bronze, is a prize of the magazine Das Neue Blatt from the Bauer Media Group, awarded for special merits in the field of popular music. The prize is named after the poet Hermann Löns.

It recognises merits in the promotion and cultivation of folk song, folk music, German folk song as well as folk entertainment and is awarded in particular to singers, composers and presenters as well as to orchestras, choirs, vocal groups and instrumental soloists. The award was presented at a festive award ceremony under the title Heimat-Melodie. The patrons included the Minister Presidents of the Federal States of Schleswig-Holstein and Bavaria, the Governing Mayor of Berlin and the Federal Minister of the Interior. The award is currently suspended.

== Recipients ==
- 1974
  - Gotthilf Fischer
- 1975
  - Alfons Bauer
  - Die Westfälischen Nachtigallen
- 1976
  - Gebirgsmusikkorps
- 1979
  - Gold: Peter Alexander
  - Gitti and Erika
  - Hellberg-Duo
- 1980
  - Gold: Heino
  - Gold: Feuerwehrkapelle Struth
  - Roy Black
- 1981
  - Gold: Edy Hildebrandt
  - Ernst Mosch and the Original Egerländer Musikanten
- 1982
  - Vico Torriani
  - Freddy Breck
- 1983
  - Gold: Karel Gott
  - Gold: Rudolf Schock
  - Gold: Marianne und Michael
  - Gold: Heinz Schenk (Munich, 25 June 1983)
- 1985
  - Erika Köth
- 1986
  - Renate & Werner Leismann
- 1987
  - Preetzer Blasorchester
- 1988
  - Uschi Bauer
  - Karl Moik
- 1989
  - Gold: Günter Wewel
  - Heidi Kabel
- 1990
  - Platin: Slavko Avsenik and his original Oberkrainer
- 1993
  - Angela Wiedl
  - Silver: Ramona Leiß
- 1994
  - Silver: Angela Wiedl
  - Bronze: Ramona Leiß
  - Stefan Moll
- Walter Scholz (Gold)
- Margot Hellwig (Bronze, Silver, Gold, Platin)
- Patrick Lindner
- Gabi Seitz
- Hansl Krönauer (4×)
- Günter Wewel (Gold)
- Speelwark
- Menskes-Chöre
- Renate and Werner Leismann (Bronze, Silver)
- Hauff und Henkler
- Original Kapelle Egerland (Platin)
- Pat & Paul and the Original Heidelerchen
- Montanara-Chor
- Carolin Reiber
- Winfried Stark and his original Steigerwälder musicians
- Heintje
