= Andreas Kretzschmer =

German lawyer, secret war councilor, composer, musicologist and folk song researcher

Franz Johann Karl Andreas Kretzschmer (1 November 1775 – 5 March 1839) was a German lawyer, secret war councilor, composer, musicologist and folk song researcher. His main folkloristic work, the Volkslied collection of 1838/40, he published under the name "A. Kretzschmer"; In a modern reprint from 1969, this name form is wrongly transformed to "August Kretzschmer".

== Life ==
Born in Stettin, Kretzschmer showed a great affinity for music from his youth on. Nevertheless, at the request of his father, a government councillor, he studied law in Berlin and then became Commissioner of Justice in his home town of Stettin. When the city fell into French hands for a few years during the Coalition Wars, Kretzschmer made a name for himself through his loyalty to Prussia and was rewarded with the Iron Cross and the title of Secret War Council. Later, at the request of the Prussian Crown Prince and later King Frederick William IV of Prussia, he was entrusted with the task of "investigating and reporting on the remnants of the Middle Ages still existing in the province of Brandenburg and especially in its spiritual institutions which still exist or have been abolished". In Berlin, he consorted with Friedrich August Wolf, Carl Maria von Weber and Carl Friedrich Zelter. He translated texts by Lord Byron and published several self-composed songs.

In 1825, he resigned from his position as a councillor of the government and worked as a judicial officer first in Halberstadt, then in Anklam. In 1835, he retired after a stroke and from then on devoted himself exclusively to literary and musical works as well as to folk song research. His plan was to publish a complete collection of German folk songs, but during his lifetime he could only publish the first volume Deutsche Volkslieder mit ihren Original-Weisen with 317 folk songs, which appeared in eight issues between 1838 and 1840, with the collaboration of Hans Ferdinand Maßmann, Anton Wilhelm von Zuccalmaglio and others. After Kretzschmer's death in Anklam at the age of 63, Zuccalmaglio published a second volume with the collaboration of Eduard Baumstar "as a continuation of A. Kretzschmer's work". Both volumes were soon criticised for not having checked the authenticity of the sources with sufficient reliability.

== Work ==
- Ideen zu einer Theorie der Musik. Löfflersche Buchhandlung, Stralsund 1833 (Digital link).
- Deutsche Volkslieder mit ihren Original-Weisen. Unter Mitwirkung des Herrn Professor Dr. Maßmann in München, des Herrn von Zuccalmaglio in Warschau, und mehrerer anderer Freunde der Volks-Poesie nach handschriftlichen Quellen herausgegeben und mit Anmerkungen versehen. Erster Theil (in 8 Heften). Vereins-Buchhandlung, Berlin 1838–1840, in einem Band 1840 (Numerized in the Deutsche Digitale Bibliothek (German Digital Library) / Digital link).
- Deutsche Volkslieder mit ihren Original-Weisen. Unter Mitwirkung des Herrn Professor E. Baumstark und mehrerer anderer Freunde der Volks-Dichtung, als Fortsetzung des A. Kretzschmer’schen Werkes gesammelt und mit Anmerkungen versehen von Anton Wilhelm von Zuccalmaglio. Second Part. Vereins-Buchhandlung, Berlin 1840 (Digital link).
- Also musical and historical essays in various newspapers and magazines.
