= Walter Scholz =

German musician

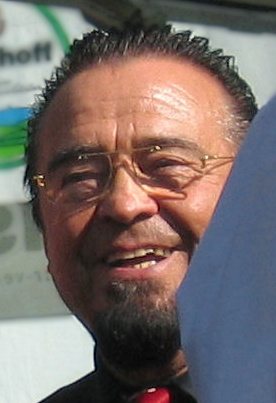
Walter Scholz (2007)

Walter Günther Scholz (born April 15, 1938 in Arolsen, Hessen-Nassau) is a German musician who is best known for playing the trumpet.

== Early life and education ==
Walter Scholz was already playing in a trombone choir at the age of six. Later, he took music lessons from Franz Willy Neugebauer. After school, he attended the Siegerland Orchestra School, where he passed his state examination in music.

== Career ==
At 17, he was a trumpet player at the State Theater in Detmold. Further stops included Mainz, Darmstadt, and the Munich Philharmonic. In 1962, he became first trumpet player with the Südwestfunk Baden-Baden Symphony Orchestra. He also frequently performed as a soloist.

In 1972, he released an LP with Rolf Schneebiegl and his brass band, the Original Schwarzwaldmusikanten. His biggest hit from that era was "Die Teufelszunge" (The Devil's Tongue). Scholz appeared on several television shows.

In 1984, he released a single with the "Sehnsuchtsmelodie" (Longing Melody), which he composed. The song became a hit, later accompanied by lyrics and performed by up-and-coming singer Harald Martin. Following this success, Scholz released several solo albums featuring folk and classical melodies as a solo trumpet player. These included numerous evergreens and several new compositions.

In 1987, Scholz and his orchestra participated in the Grand Prix der Volksmusik. He achieved 11th place with his piece "Musikantenmarsch." At the 1989 Grand Prix der Volksmusik, he attempted the German preliminary round again with the piece "Polka for 4 Trumpets," but failed to advance to the final.

On the occasion of his 70th birthday, Scholz was awarded the title of Honorary Ambassador of the World Choir Games. The award was presented to him on April 15, 2008, by Günter Titsch, President of the Interkultur Association.

Scholz can still be seen and heard at popular radio and television events, as well as at other events. Scholz currently lives in Achern, Baden-Württemberg, with his second wife, Silvia, who manages the company. He has one son, Alexander.

At over 80 years of age, he practices the trumpet four to five hours a day to maintain his wind muscles, as he releases a new album of self-composed works every year and plays around 120 concerts on international tours. He always pays special attention to the high flexibility of his double reed.

== Personal life ==
He has been married to a former singer of the Fischer-Chöre since August 18, 1988, and has a son with her. Scholz has two sons and a daughter from his first marriage.

== Legacy ==
Scholz is considered Germany's most successful trumpeter. He has received ten gold records and three platinum awards for his 15 million records sold worldwide. Herbert von Karajan called him the "trumpeter of the century," and Robert Stolz called him the "trumpeter with the sensitive sound."

== Honours ==
- Order of Merit of the Federal Republic of Germany
- Order of Merit of Baden-Württemberg
- Hermann-Löns-Medaille in gold and bronze
- Robert Stolz Prize with Robert Stolz Medal

== Works ==
- 1972: Oh, mein Papa
- 1974: Der alte Dessauer (Marsch)
- 1974: Die Post im Walde
- 1974: Die Teufelszunge
- 1978: Still ruht der See
- 1982: Blaue Berge, grüne Täler (Riesengebirglers Heimatlied)
- 1982: Das Echo der Liebe
- 1984: Sehnsuchtsmelodie
- 1985: Amazing Grace
- 1985: Il Silenzio
- 1985: Ave Maria no morro
- 1985: Wunderland bei Nacht
- 1987: Heimwehmelodie
- 2003: Song of Freedom

== Discography ==
=== LPs ===
- 1972: Volkstümliches Trompetenkonzert
- 1974: Die Teufelszunge
- 1975: Festliches Trompetenkonzert
- 1986: Sehnsuchtsmelodie
- 1986: Traumkonzert mit Walter Scholz (2 LP)
- 1987: Wir machen Musik

=== CDs ===
- 1982: Ich bin so gern daheim
- 1984: Sehnsuchtsmelodie
- 1985: Echo der Liebe
- 1986: Traummelodien (CH: )
- 1987: Wir machen Musik Walter Scholz
- 1987: Wunschmelodien – Lieder, die man nie vergisst Walter Scholz
- 1988: Ich denk’ an Dich
- 1989: Melodien, die von Herzen kommen
- 1991: Trompetenzauber
- 1992: Traummelodien
- 1992: Sehnsuchtsmelodien
- 1993: Klassik-Träume
- 1994: Trompeten-Welthits
- 1996: Brennende Herzen
- 1996: Walter Scholz 16 Trompetenhits
- 1996: Sehnsuchtsmelodie
- 1997: Zauber der Trompete
- 1999: Trompetenperlen
- 1999: Die schönsten Melodien zur Weihnachtszeit
- 2000: Goldene Trompetenklänge zur Weihnachtszeit
- 2001: Sierra Nevada
- 2001: Seine größten Erfolge
- 2006: Seine schönsten Trompeten-Melodien
- 2007: Götterfunken mit Marshall &amp; Alexander
- 2008: Bolero der Herzen mit dem Montanara-Chor
- 2010: Eine Reise durch die Südsee
- 2012: Rosen nur für dich
- 2015: Trompetenträume zur Weihnachtszeit
- 2016: Trompeten-Feuerwerk
- 2019: Trompete für dich
