= Violin Concerto in G major =

Violin Concerto in G major may refer to:

- Violin Concerto No. 4 (Haydn)
- Violin Concerto No. 3 (Mozart)
- Violin Concerto (Rubinstein)
