= Fischer-Chöre =

Fischer-Chöre (Fischer choirs) is a group of children's choirs, youth choirs, men's choirs, and mixed choirs that were founded and conducted by Gotthilf Fischer, based in the Stuttgart area.

== History ==
In 1946 at the age of 18, Gotthilf Fischer took over the direction of the Deizisau Choir, later followed by other choirs. These choirs sometimes combine for a common performances encompassing over 1,500 voices.

The first television appearance was in 1969. With their performance at the Soccer World Cup in 1974 they became known to a worldwide audience. Major tours include visits to Rome, Jerusalem, and the USA.

The choirs are popular in German TV and participate in many entertainment programs. In 1990 Gotthilf Fischer and his choirs received their own program, Strasse der Lieder (Road of the Songs).

== Repertoire ==
The repertoire of the group includes traditional songs, and classical and operatic choir songs.
