= Hermann Erdlen =

20th-century German composer

Hermann Erdlen (16 July 1893 – 30 June 1972) was a German composer.

== Life ==
Born in Hamburg, Erdlen received his musical education at the Bernuth Conservatory in his native town and through studies with Emil Krause (composition), Goby Eberhardt (violin), Karl Goltermann (piano and organ) and Wilhelm Vilmar (singing). Like Erwin Lendvai, he was active in the Lobeda Movement founded by Carl Hannemann, whose members were later particularly fond of his Deutsches Requiem and the Saar-Kantate. The first song compositions by him appeared as early as 1910. In addition to his work as a composer, he was active as a music writer and music critic from 1911 to 1936 and gave guest performances as a conductor in Hamburg, Wiesbaden, Kiel, Dresden and at the Nordische Rundfunk AG. From 1928, he taught music theory, historical musicology and instrumentation at the Hansische Hochschule für Lehrerbildung and at the Institut für Lehrerfortbildung in Hamburg. Since 1 May 1937, Erdlen was a member of the NSDAP (member number: 4.956.880). From 1945 onwards, he worked as a freelance artist and music writer in Hamburg.

Erdlen wrote works for orchestral and chamber music ensembles, works for (amateur) choir, solo songs and also stage music. His musical legacy can be found in the Deutsches Komponistenarchiv in the Europäisches Zentrum der Künste Hellerau in Dresden.

Erdlen died in Hamburg at the age of 78.

== Work ==
Orchestral work

- Passacaglia und Fuge
- Finnische Tänze
- Konzertouvertüre BBC

Chamber music

- Sonate in D für Violine und Klavier
- Chaconne für Violine und Orgel
- Thema und 12 Variationen über "Der Winter ist vergangen"

Choral work

- Zeit zu Zeit
- Requiem für die Gefallenen
- "Aber dies, aber das", ein Löns-Liederspiel

Stage music

- Der Gaukler und das Klingelspiel
- Alpenkönig und Menschenfeind
- 1000 Jahre Hamburg

Others

- 88 Spielübungen für die diatonische harmonica
