= Kein schöner Land (TV series) =

German music television series

- Genre: Music entertainment
- Presented by: Günter Wewel
- Country of origin: Germany
- Original language: German

Production
- Production locations: varioue in Germany and Europe
- Running time: 45 minutes

Original release
- Network: ARD (Saarländischer Rundfunk)
- Release: 12 January 1989

Kein schöner Land was a television series of musical entertainment about regions in Europe, aired by ARD from 1989 to 2007 in different intervals in evening programs. The subtitle Lieder, Landschaften, Musikanten specified its focus on songs, landscapes and musicians. It was presented by Günter Wewel, and produced by Saarländischer Rundfunk (SR).

== History and program ==
Kein schöner Land was initiated by Hans-Bernhard Theopold, head of the department entertainment at the SR. It was presented by Kammersänger Günter Wewel, who also regularly performed songs. His wife was often present, in the audience or in minor roles, without being mentioned. The series ran in episodes of 45 minutes, aired by ARD from 1989 to 2007 in evening programs, at different intervals.

Each episode of the broadcasts of 45 minutes presented a region or town or tour in Germany or Europe, with the key topic music from the locality filmed there, and touching themes such as landscape, culture, crafts, traditions and cuisine. The series is named after the popular song "Kein schöner Land in dieser Zeit" (No land more beautiful). The music was often performed by local musicians or ensembles, such as the Neue Rheingauer Kantorei in the episode about the Rheingau. It covered a broad range of styles from Volkslied to popular classical music, sometimes including artists known beyond the region. The series also worked as tourist advertisement, showing tourist organisations with thanks in the closing credits.

The ARD began the series on Thursdays after 9pm, first on 12 January 1989. Later, it was changed to monthly airing on Mondays at 8:15pm. From 2003, it was aired only during the sommer months. In 2007, when it was terminated, cultural programs began to repeat episodes, especially Hessische Rundfunk and the Südwestrundfunk. Many of the more than 150 episodes are available on VHS and DVD.

== Locations ==
Episodes were filmed, among others, in:

- Aachen and the Nordeifel
- Allgäu
- Amsterdam
- Andalusia – Gibraltar to Jerez
- Appenzellerland
- Bamberg
- Bayerischer Wald
- Berchtesgadener Land
- Bergisches Land
- Berlin
- Berner Oberland
- Black Forest
- Bodensee – Lindau via Mainau to Stein am Rhein
- Braunschweig and Wolfenbüttel
- Bregenz
- Bremen and Bremerhaven
- Budapest
- Burgenland
- Capri
- Carinthia and Upper Carinthia
- Chiemgauer Alpen
- Chiemsee
- Chur and Graubünden
- Coburg, Thuringia and Harz
- Cologne
- Davos, Klosters, Prättigau
- Dolomites
- Dresden
- Eiderstedt (for Christmas)
- Eisenach, Erfurt, Weimar
- Elsass
- Engadin
- Flensburger Förde
- Florenz
- Fränkische Schweiz
- Franconia
- Gran Canaria
- Hamburg
- Harz
- Heidelberg
- Hohe Tauern
- Innsbruck
- Kaiserstuhl
- Kleinwalsertal and Landkreis Oberallgäu
- Konstanz
- Korfu
- Kufstein and Wilder Kaiser
- Lake Garda
- Lanzarote
- Leipzig
- Lübeck and Holsteinische Schweiz
- Lüneburger Heide
- Luxemburg
- Lucerne and Lake Lucerne
- Mallorca
- Malta
- Mark Brandenburg
- Matterhorn
- Meran and Vinschgau
- Montafon (for Christmas)
- Moselle — Trier to Cochem
- Munich
- Münsterland
- Naples, Ischia, Capri
- North Sea and Baltic Sea
- North Sea coast
- Nürnberg
- Oberlausitz
- Odenwald
- Ore Mountains (for Christmas)
- Osnabrücker Land
- Osttirol
- Paris
- Palatinate – Deutsche Weinstraße
- Potsdam
- Prague
- Regensburg
- Rheingau
- Rhine
- Rome and Vatican
- Ruhr
- Middle Rhine
- Rostock
- Rügen and Stralsund
- Saarland
- Salzburger Land
- Sauerland
- Spas in Austria, Hungary, Slovenia
- St. Moritz
- Suevia
- Schwäbische Alb
- Styria
- Südtirol – Bolzano
- Sylt, Husum
- Tegernsee
- Tenerife
- Tessin
- Thuringian Forest
- Trentino
- Ulm
- Veltlin (for Christmas)
- Venice
- Vienna
- Weserbergland
- Wörthersee
- Würzburg
- Zillertal
- Zugspitze

Routes of tours include:

- Franconian Forest to Neuburg
- Reschensee to Ortler
- Steigerwald to Chiemgau
- Saar to Lipper Land
- Frankfurt to Taunus
- Freiburg to Strasbourg
- Granada to Sevilla
- Greifswald to Usedom
- Hamburg to Helgoland
- Schwerin to Wismar
- Passau to Budapest
- Villach to Millstätter See
- Weimar to Merseburg
- Wismar to Bremen
- Oder to Spree
