= Violin Concerto (Rubinstein) =

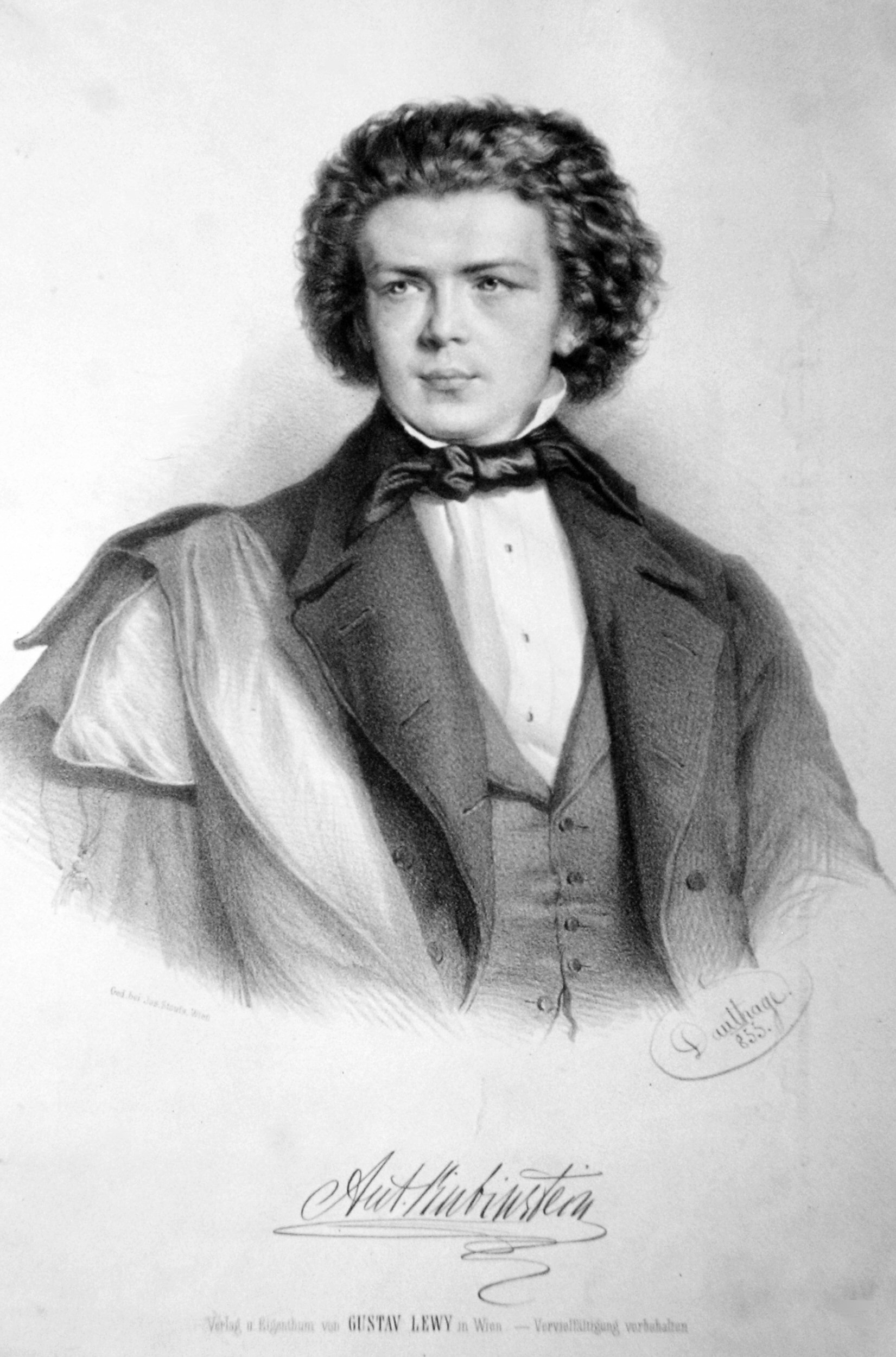
Lithograph of Anton Rubinstein, 1855

The Violin Concerto in G major, Op. 46, is the sole violin concerto by Anton Rubinstein. Written in the Romantic style in 1857, when the composer was 28 years old, it was published by C.F. Peters in 1859 with a dedication to violinist Henryk Wieniawski. The work makes virtuoso demands of its soloist; and its character is more German in the tradition of Mendelssohn than Russian, likely all factors in its failure to claim a place in the standard repertory.

August Wilhelmj arranged the concerto in an edition for violin with orchestra or piano. According to Goby Eberhardt, who studied with Wilhelmj, Rubinstein was displeased with Wilhelmj's arrangement.

== Structure ==
The concerto is in three movements:

1. Moderato assai
2. Andante
3. Moderato assai
