= Waldbröl =

- Town
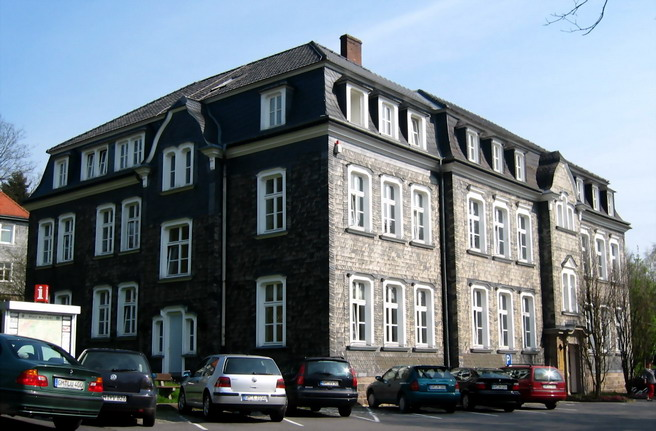
- Town hall in Waldbröl

- Flag Coat of arms

- Location of Waldbröl within Oberbergischer Kreis district
- Interactive map of Waldbröl
- Location within Germany Location within North Rhine-Westphalia
- Coordinates: 50°52′44″N 7°36′54″E
- Country: Germany
- State: North Rhine-Westphalia
- Admin. region: Cologne
- District: Oberbergischer Kreis
- Subdivisions: 64

Government
  - Mayor (2020–25): Larissa Weber (Ind.)

Area
  - Total: 63.32 km^{2} (24.45 sq mi)
- Elevation: 200–400 m (660–1,310 ft)

Population (2025-12-31)
  - Total: 19,716
  - Density: 311.4/km^{2} (806.4/sq mi)
- Time zone: UTC+01:00 (CET)
  - Summer (DST): UTC+02:00 (CEST)
- Postal codes: 51545
- Dialling codes: 02291
- Vehicle registration: GM
- Website: waldbroel.de

Waldbröl (German pronunciation: [ˈvaltˌbʁøːl]) is a town in the southern part of the Oberbergischer Kreis (upper Berg county), in North Rhine-Westphalia, Germany.

== Geography ==
=== Location ===
The town is located on the slopes of the Nutscheid range of hills and is part of the Bergisches Land Nature Park. It is about 64 kilometres (40 miles) east of the city of Cologne.

=== Neighbouring municipalities ===
The neighbouring municipalities of Waldbröl are, clockwise starting in the north, Reichshof, Morsbach, Wissen (Sieg), Windeck, Ruppichteroth and Nümbrecht. The market town of Waldbröl is home to a hospital, secondary schools, and shopping facilities. Waldbröl is therefore the main town in an area of around 65,000 inhabitants, that stretches from Bruchermühle in the north to Herchen in the south and from Ruppichteroth in the west to Friesenhagen in the east.

=== Municipal subdivisions ===
In addition to Waldbröl itself, which has a population of about 11,000, there are 64 separate sub-districts:

| A | Alfenzingen - Altehufen |
| B | Baumen - Bech - Bettenhagen - Bettingen - Biebelshof – Bladersbach – Bohlenhagen - Brenzingen - Bröl - Brölerhütte - Bruchhausen |
| D | Dahl - Dickhausen - Diepenthal - Diezenkausen - Drinhausen |
| E | Escherhof |
| F | Fahrenseifen |
| G | Geilenkausen - Geiningen - Großenseifen - Grünenbach - Grunewald |
| H | Hahn - Happach - Heide - Helten - Helzen - Herfen - Hermesdorf – Hillesmühle - Hochwald - Hoff - Hufen |
| K | Krahwinkel |
| L | Luetzingen |
| M | Mühlenbach |
| N | Neuenhähnen - Niederhausen - Niederhof |
| P | Propach - Puhl – Pulvermühle |
| R | Rölefeld - Romberg - Rossenbach – Rottland - Ruh |
| S | Schnörringen - Schönenbach - Seifen - Spurkenbach |
| T | Thierseifen |
| V | Vierbuchen - Vierbuchermühle |
| W | When - Wies - Wilkenroth - Wippenkausen |
| Z | Ziegenhardt |

== History ==
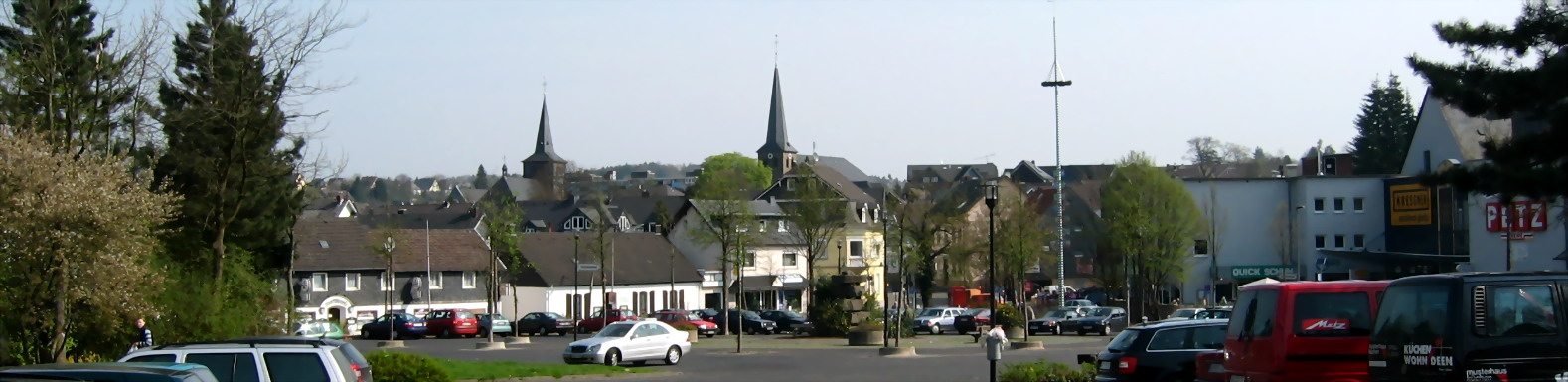
View from the market place with the Roman Catholic (l) and Protestant (r) churches

In 1131, the place was mentioned for the first time, as Waltprugele in a papal deed of ownership for the St. Cassius abbey in Bonn. In this document Pope Innocent II confirmed the Church's ownership and the ecclesiastical tithe (which later evolved into land tax and wealth tax). Back then, this housing estate belonged to the sphere of influence of the first counts of Berg, as well as of the first counts of Sayn. In the same year, construction began on a new Protestant church, whose steeple survives to the present day.

In 1174, Waldbröl came under the governance of Homburg, which was owned by the counts of Sayn. However, the property situation between the counts of Berg and of Sayn remained controversial.

The first reference to a Waldbröl citizen was in a document of 1212, when a priest named Wolradu resided there and made a donation to St. Michael's abbey in the Berg county.

In 1261, the knightly Isengarten dynasty was mentioned for the first time, followed by Diezenkausen in 1300 and Beuinghausen in 1323. They were long term ministers of the counts of Sayn and Berg and had received fiefs from them in the area of the modern town.

In 1314, Waldbröl experienced an epidemic plague and a big famine. The first modern districts of Waldbröl were mentioned in 1316. In 1575, almost all today's districts were drawn on the map by Arnoldus Mercator. (Note: Probably the eldest son of Gerardus Mercator, who followed his father's profession.)

By the Treaty of Siegburg, Waldbröl went to the duchy of Berg and was attributed to the Windeck authority. When Johann Wilhelm, the last duke of Berg-Mark, died in 1609, the Treaty of Xanten attributed the Berg County (including Waldbröl) to the duchy of Pfalz-Neuburg of the Wittelsbach family.

Between 1816 and 1932, the town of Waldbröl was the residence of the head of the district authority and seat of the Prussian Administrative District of Waldbröl existing at that time.

On 15 December 1906 the extension of the Wiehl Valley railroad was brought on steam from Wiehl to Waldbröl, linking Waldbröl to the German railway network.

=== Nazi period ===
Hailing from Niederbreidenbach near Nümbrecht, Dr. Robert Ley, one of the leading representatives of National Socialism, intended to make Waldbröl the "largest town between Cologne and Kassel". Amongst other things, the so-called Volkstraktorenwerke (National Tractor Plants), an Adolf Hitler School, and a Strength Through Joy (KdF) hotel were projected. Aside from the uncompleted hotel, none of the projects was ever realised. The population figure was meant to increase up to 300,000. It was planned to establish an underground barracks, a theatre, a cinema and a motorway access. Planning continued until autumn 1944 but then got stuck in an early stage due to the course of the war and Ley's waning influence. Only the topographical studies of the garden and landscape designer Wilhelm Heintz, who was already involved in the planning of the "Town Of The Hermann Göring Plants (Salzgitter)" and the "Town Of The KdF Vehicle (Volkswagen Beetle) (Wolfsburg), were finished to a large extent. Apart from some unfinished buildings, only the hotel survived and initially after the war served as hospital, subsequently as school of the German armed forces and since 2006 as 'centre for encounter' of the European Institute of Applied Buddhism. Furthermore, the former architect house of the planned Adolf Hitler School still exists. Since the early 1950s it has served as the country hostel of the Humboldt Grammar School in Düsseldorf.

=== After WW II ===
In 1957, Waldbröl was the third municipality in upper Berg county to be awarded the status of "town".

Between 1990 and 2006, Waldbröl was the location of the German Armed Forces Academy for Information and Communication (Akademie der Bundeswehr für Information und Kommunikation), which was founded here and like its predecessors the Transformation Centre (), the Psychological Defense School (Schule für psychologische Verteidigung), the Communication Academy (Akademie für Kommunikation), the Department for Studies and Exercises (Amt für Studien und Übungen), and the Centre For Analyses And Studies (Zentrum für Analysen und Studien), was accommodated in the hotel building.

From 1990 onwards, Waldbröl was the destination of intense immigration of ethnic German immigrants from the Soviet Union/CIS countries; at least 3,000 of them became inhabitants of Waldbröl. Among others, this process was fostered by the fact that Waldbröl resident Horst Waffenschmidt was Commissioner for Ethnic German Immigrants (Aussiedlerbeauftragter) of the Federal Government.

== Town coat of arms ==
Since 1952 Waldbröl has been entitled to bear the town coat of arms as described in §2, section 2, of the main statute of the town: "On a green ground a black oak tree, bearing leaves and acorns, between two small silver shields. At the base of the tree a silver brook flows. The left-hand shield bears an inverted blue ploughshare; the right-hand shield bears a red lion rampant, with blue teeth and claws and a forked tail."

== Facilities ==
- District Hospital
- District court
- Centre for a Buddhist religious community, in the former armed forces academy is the European Institute of Applied Buddhism, The EIAB. 20 monks and 30 nuns live there as apprentices of the Zen master Thich Nhat Hanh. He is the best known Buddhist after the Dalai Lama.

== Twin towns ==
- Witham (United Kingdom)
- Jüterbog (Brandenburg)
- Świebodzice (Poland)

== Places of interest and buildings ==
- Protestant church with 12th century Romanesque style steeple and 12th century baptismal font
- Catholic church
- Bruchhausen Mill (Bruchhauser Mühle)
- "The Wall: (aka "the Hitler Wall"), a remnant of Robert Ley's megalomaniacal projects during the Nazi era, offering an panoramic view of Waldbröl and a magnificent distant view over the landscape of upper Berg county. It was a part of the projected Adolf Hitler School. In the early 1980s, unknowns painted the slogan "No more war!" in huge letters upon the wall. Recently the wall got a complete overhaul and the slogan was re-painted. The wall is now officially approved as a "Monument To Peace".
- In 1863, a monument was erected in the vicinity of the Protestant church in honour of Prussian King Frederick William III: a donation from the Waldbröl district on the occasion of the 50th anniversary of the struggle for independence of the Prussian state. The inscription reads: "Dem Könige Friedrich Wilhelm III. der Kreis Waldbröl – 17. März 1863 (Dedicated to King Frederick William III The Waldbröl district - 17 March 1863)"
- Terminal station of the heritage-protected Wiehl Valley Railway (Wiehltalbahn); historic steam locomotive 'Waldbröl' (Sorry, German only).
- Since autumn 2015, there is a combined youth hostel/nature discovery park on the area of the former Nutscheid-barracks at the Nutscheidstraße – between the southwestern edge of the heart of the town and the Herfen urban district: Panarbora. The roughly one-mile (1635 m) long canopy pathway of the park runs at a height of max. 131.2 ft (40 m) and has an access- and viewing tower 111.5 ft (34 m) high.

== Population ==
Historical population

| Year | Pop. | ±% p.a. |
|---|---|---|
| 1953 | 11,266 | — |
| 1957 | 11,601 | +0.74% |
| 1965 | 12,591 | +1.03% |
| 1970 | 13,790 | +1.84% |
| 1975 | 14,192 | +0.58% |
| 1980 | 15,051 | +1.18% |
| 1985 | 14,574 | −0.64% |
| 1990 | 16,244 | +2.19% |

| Year | Pop. | ±% p.a. |
|---|---|---|
| 1995 | 18,490 | +2.62% |
| 2000 | 18,835 | +0.37% |
| 2005 | 19,636 | +0.84% |
| 2010 | 19,333 | −0.31% |
| 2015 | 19,194 | −0.14% |
| 2020 | 19,599 | +0.42% |
| 2025 | 19,716 | +0.12% |

Source: Landesdatabank Nordrhein-Westfalen (1965-2025)

== Schools ==
- Elementary schools in Waldbröl-Hermesdorf, Waldbröl-Isengarten and Waldbröl-Wiedenhof
- Common main school, Waldbröl
- Municipal middle school, Waldbröl
- Comprehensive school, Waldbröl
- Hollenberg grammar school, Waldbröl
- Business college of upper Berg county, Waldbröl
- Roseggerschule, special school for educationally handicapped students
- Nursing school of the Waldbröl county hospital

== Personalities ==
=== Born in Waldbröl ===
- Anton Wilhelm von Zuccalmaglio, musicologist, folk song collector, and composer
- Malek Jandali, pianist
- Marianne Roetzel, sculptor
- Ernst Wille, painter
- Franz Dumont (1945–2012), historian
- Hermann Pampus (1900–1973), sportsman and town fire chief
- Jan Schlaudraff, football player at Hannover 96

=== Past occasional residents ===
- Dr. Horst Waffenschmidt, politician - Christian Democratic Union
- Manfred Melzer, Roman Catholic suffragan bishop of Cologne, priest in Waldbröl 1989–1995
- Dr. Robert Ley, politician in the Nazi era. Lived in Rottland manor between 1935 and 1945.
- Ferdi Huick (born 2 May 1940; died 6 April 2006), Cologne carnival artist "Der bergische Landbote (County Herald of Berg County)", had his last domicile in Waldbröl. He made numerous radio and TV appearances as "Der bergische Landbote".

=== Current residents ===
- Chris Roberts pop singer

=== Notable visitors ===
- D.H. Lawrence, the English novelist, took the Bröl Valley Railway (Bröltalbahn) to Waldbröl, Germany's first narrow-gauge railway on 11 May 1912, when he was almost unknown. Lawrence stayed in Waldbröl, for a fortnight, with Johanna ('Hannah') and Karl Krenkow, the latter being a brother-in-law of David Herbert Lawrence's maternal aunt, Ada Krenkow. Aside from numerous letters to his mistress, Frieda von Richthofen, he worked on the novel Sons and Lovers, which was released in the following year and founded the worldwide fame of the author.
- German Emperor Wilhelm II: In 1913, the German Emperor visited the town and in his honour the main street was renamed to Kaiserstraße (Emperor Street).

== Regular events ==
Cattle market, village fair, St. Martin's market, Christmas market, historic train rides on the Wiehltalbahn.

== Religious community ==
- Free Evangelical Community
- Baptist Church (Registered association)
- Mennonite Brethren
- Plymouth Brethren
- Apostolate Community of the United Hearts of Jesus and Mary (Registered association)
- Jehovah's Witnesses

== Social organizations ==
- Village community Boxberg
- Village community Brenzingen
- Society for tourism and town embellishing Waldbröl (Registered association)
- Waldbröler MGV 1862 (Registered association)
- Zither circle, Waldbröl
- Singing society, Waldbröl
- Badminton club, Waldbröl
- Chess association 1928 (Registered association), Waldbröl
- Swimming association (Registered association), Waldbröl (1935/59)
- Sports community for invalids (Versehrtensportgemeinschaft Waldbröl), Waldbröl
- TuS 06 Waldbröl (Registered association)
- Tennis club "Tennisfreunde am Schornstein (Registered association)" (tennis friends at the chimney)
- Town sport organization, Waldbröl
- Outdoor sport association (soccer), Waldbröl
- Misc. wildlife and nature societies
- Förderkreis Zur Rettung Der Wiehltalbahn (Society for the Preservation of the Wiehl Valley Railway)

== Literature ==
- Otto Budde, Waldbröl – wie es wurde, was es ist, Gummersbach 1981
- Otto Budde, Das Dorf der Väter, Gummersbach 1987
- Gottfried Corbach, Geschichte von Waldbröl, Cologne 1973
