= Manfred Melzer =

German bishop (1944–2018)

The Most Reverend Manfred Melzer
- Auxiliary bishop of Cologne
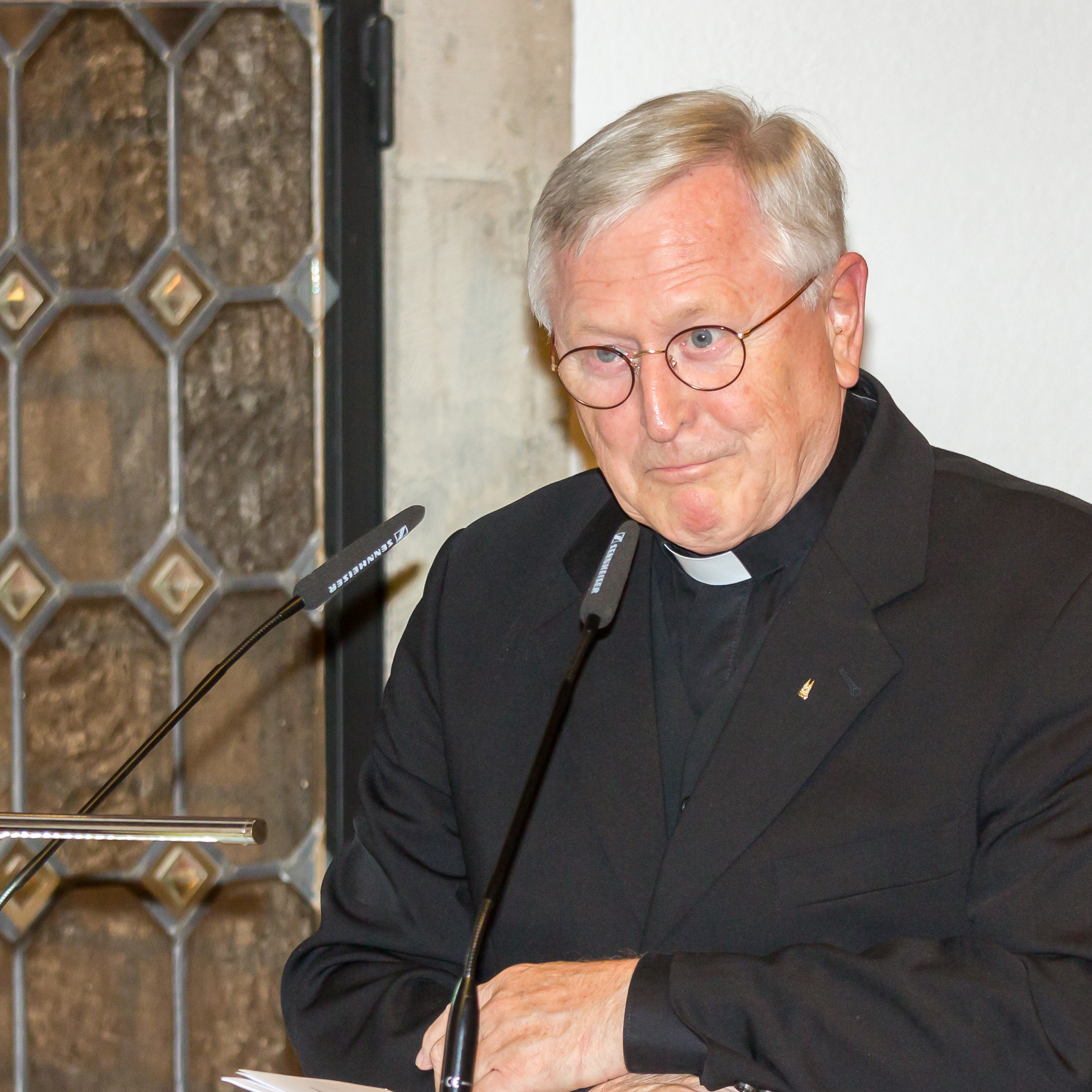
- Manfred Melzer, 2014
- Diocese: Carinola (Titular)

Orders
- Ordination: 1 February 1972
- Consecration: 10 September 1995
- Rank: Auxiliary Bishop of Cologne

Personal details
- Born: 28 February 1944 Solingen-Ohligs, Nazi Germany
- Died: 9 August 2018 (aged 74) Frechen, Germany
- Denomination: Roman Catholic
- Motto: Deum Diligendo cognoscere
- Coat of arms

Manfred Melzer (28 February 1944 – 9 August 2018) was a German bishop of the Roman Catholic Church. Appointed by Pope Benedict XVI, Melzer was serving as an Auxiliary Bishop of the Archdiocese of Cologne from 1995 to 2015.

== Early life ==
Born in Solingen-Ohligs, Melzer studied in Bonn, Freiburg im Breisgau and Cologne for theology. He was ordained to the Priesthood on 1 February 1972 by Cardinal Joseph Höffner, the then Archbishop of Cologne at the Cologne Cathedral. Upon his ordination, Cardinal Höffner made Melzer his personal secretary and the cathedral administrator. He remained Cardinal Höffner's secretary until Höffner's death in 1987. On 17 March 1984, Pope John Paul II appointed him Chaplain of His Holiness. In 1988, he began serving as a priest in Waldbröl and the municipality of Nümbrecht.

== Episcopal career ==
On 9 June 1995, Pope John Paul II appointed Melzer the titular bishop of Carinola (Italy) and auxiliary bishop in Cologne. He was consecrated by the Cologne archbishop Joachim Meisner on 10 September 1995 in the Cologne Cathedral. Melzer was responsible for the pastoral district middle of the archbishopric of Cologne; the town and surroundings (20 deanships). At the same time, the archbishop appointed him the bishop's curate for the women's orders in the archbishopric of Cologne. In 1998 Melzer was chosen in the metropolitan chapter.

As a member of the German Bishops' Conference, he was a member of the pastoral commission and the commission for questions of the world church. Since 2004, Melzer was also chairperson of German Lourdes, an association Cologne inc. He also was the representative of the Archdiocese of Cologne in Misereor eV and representative of the Archbishop in the Cardinal Höffner Society. In 2006 the German bishops chose him to be the representative for Catholic police officers in Germany and to take care of their spiritual welfare.
