= Das Neue Blatt =

German women's magazine

- Categories: women's magazine
- Frequency: Weekly
- Founded: 1950
- Company: Bauer
- Country: Germany
- Language: German
- ISSN: 0939-8538
- OCLC: 1127107762

Das Neue Blatt (German: "The New Page") is a weekly tabloid women's magazine published in Germany.

== History and profile ==
Das Neue Blatt was first published in 1950. Printed in Germany, it is distributed by the Hamburg-based Bauer Verlagsgruppe (Publishing Group) and distributed in the United States by German Language Publications in Englewood, New Jersey. The magazine is published by Bauer Media Group on a weekly basis and is headquartered in Hamburg.

Like other German tabloids, Das Neue Blatt reports predominantly about European royalty and celebrities. Other typical themes are health, cooking, fashion, travel, and better living. Since 2002 the chief editor has been Kai Winckler.

== Circulation ==
During the fourth quarter of 2000 the circulation of Das Neue Blatt was 1,002,051 copies. In 2001 it was one of top 50 women's magazine worldwide with a circulation of 1,002,000 copies.

The circulation of Das Neue Blatt was 902,000 copies in 2006. The magazine had a circulation of 518,897 copies in 2010.
