= Deizisau =

Town in Baden-Württemberg, Germany

- Municipality
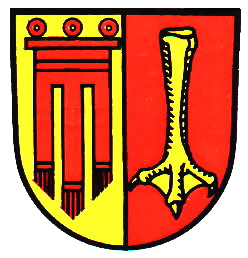
- Coat of arms

- Location of Deizisau within Esslingen district
- Interactive map of Deizisau
- Location within Germany Location within Baden-Württemberg
- Coordinates: 48°42′48″N 9°23′21″E
- Country: Germany
- State: Baden-Württemberg
- Admin. region: Stuttgart
- District: Esslingen

Government
  - Mayor (2017–25): Thomas Matrohs

Area
  - Total: 5.17 km^{2} (2.00 sq mi)
- Elevation: 270 m (890 ft)

Population (2025-12-31)
  - Total: 6,685
  - Density: 1,290/km^{2} (3,350/sq mi)
- Time zone: UTC+01:00 (CET)
  - Summer (DST): UTC+02:00 (CEST)
- Postal codes: 73779
- Dialling codes: 07153
- Vehicle registration: ES
- Website: www.deizisau.de

Deizisau (Swabian: Deizisao) is a town in the district of Esslingen in Baden-Württemberg in southern Germany. It belongs to the Stuttgart Region (until 1992 Region Mittlerer Neckar) and the Stuttgart Metropolitan Region. Deizisau is located between the towns of Plochingen and Esslingen am Neckar, about 20 kilometers southeast of Stuttgart, the capital of Baden-Württemberg. The river Neckar flows through this town.

== Geography ==
=== Geographical situation ===
Deizisau is located on the left hillside of the Neckar-valley shortly after the "Neckarknie" in Plochingen where the river changes direction from northeast to northwest. At the western border of Deizisau, the Körsch flows into the Neckar; in the east a part of the Plochinger Kopf above the river knee lies inside the boundary.

=== Town outline ===
No other villages except for the small town Deizisau belong to the Deizisau municipality. Inside the boundary of the municipality lies the abandoned village Kersch.

=== Neighbouring towns ===
Adjoining municipalities are in the north Altbach, in the northeast Plochingen, in the southeast Wernau, in the south Köngen, in the southwest Denkendorf and in the northwest Esslingen am Neckar.

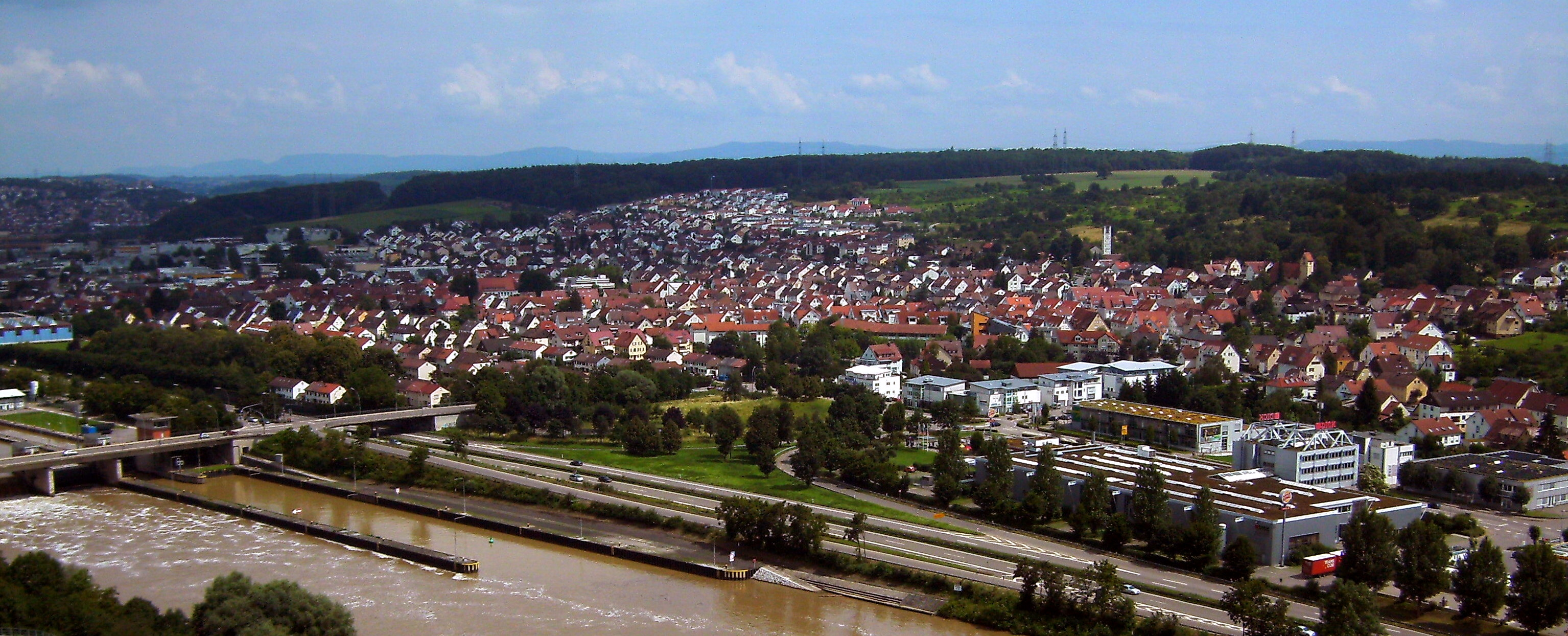
View of Deizisau from Altbach Power Station

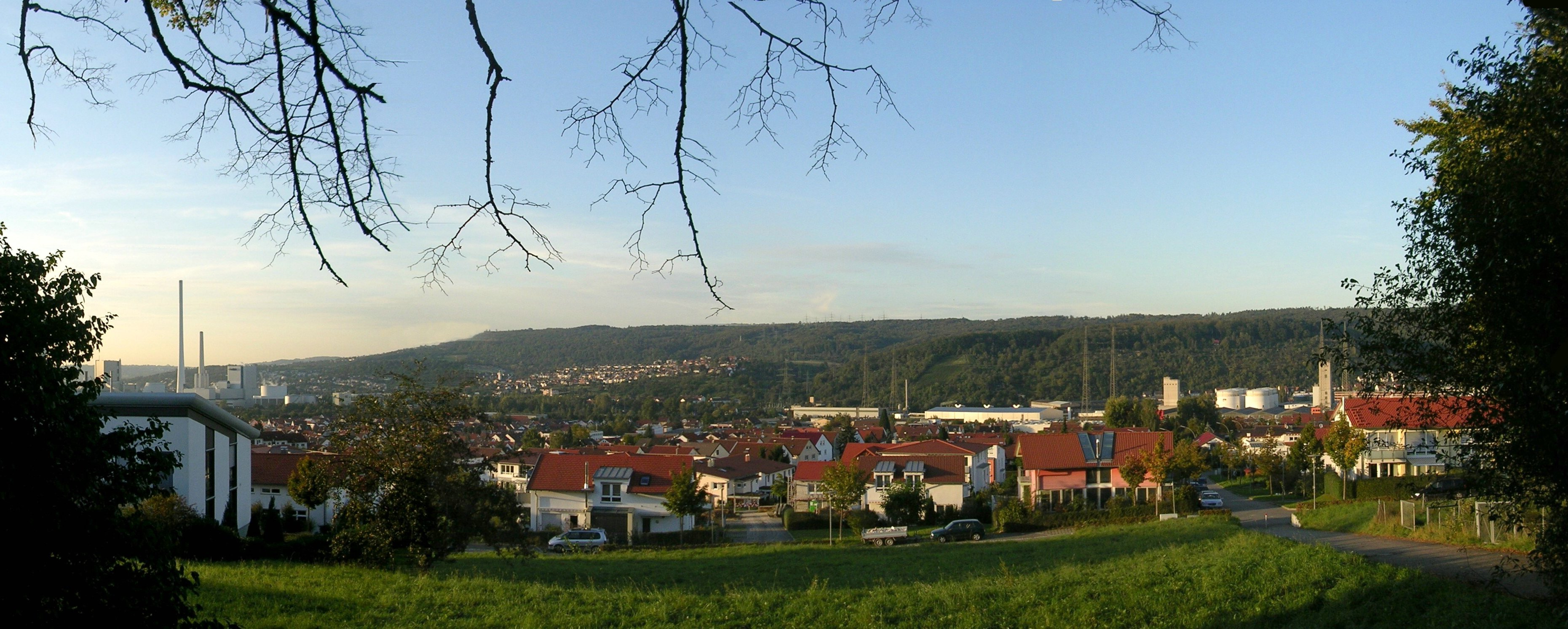
View from hillside on Deizisau

== History ==
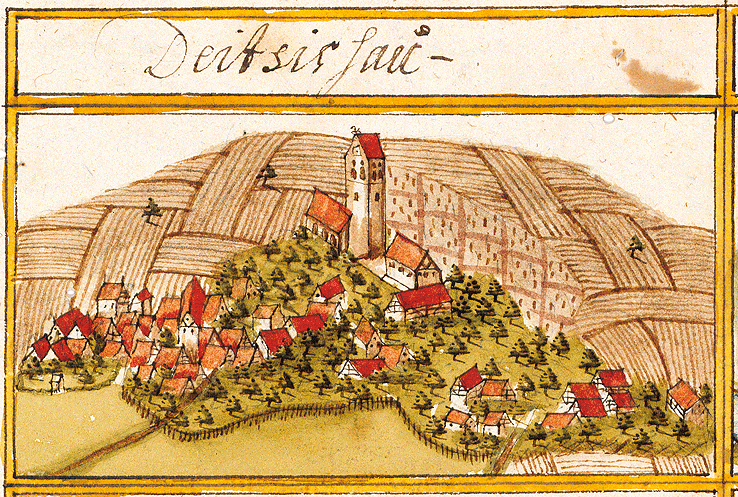
Deizisau 1683/1685 in the Kieserschen Forstlagerbuch

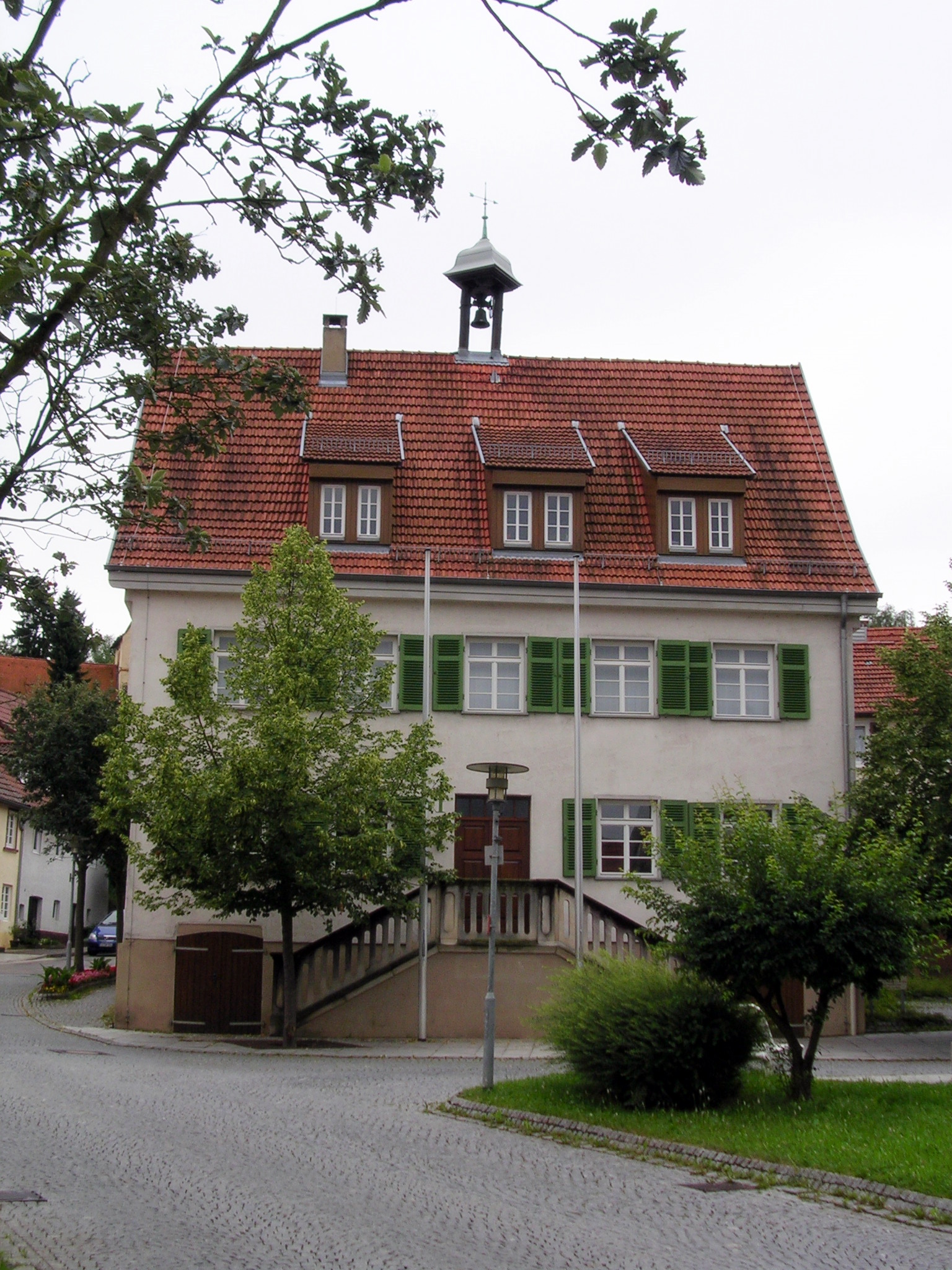
Old town hall from the 17th century

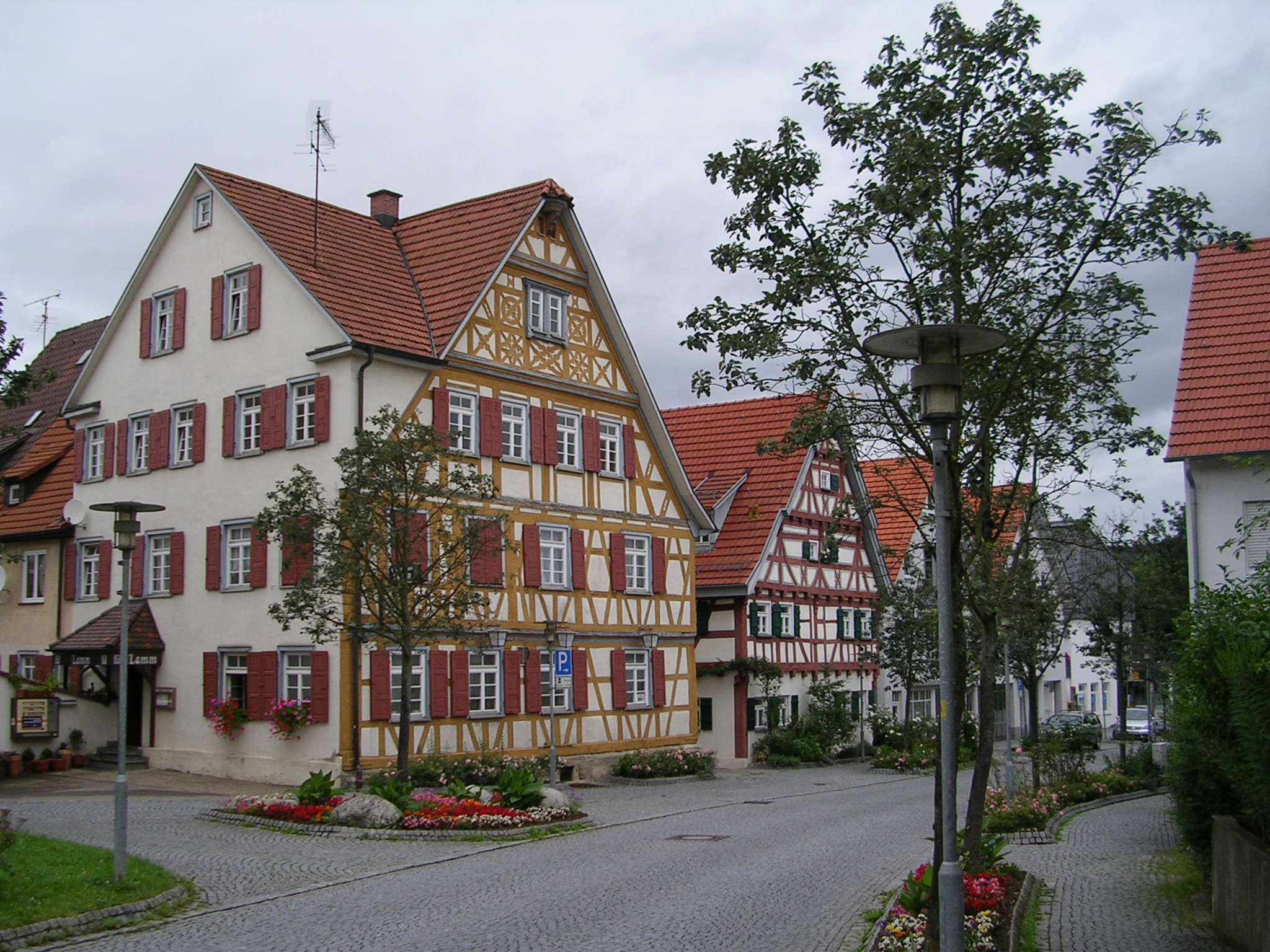
Marktstraße

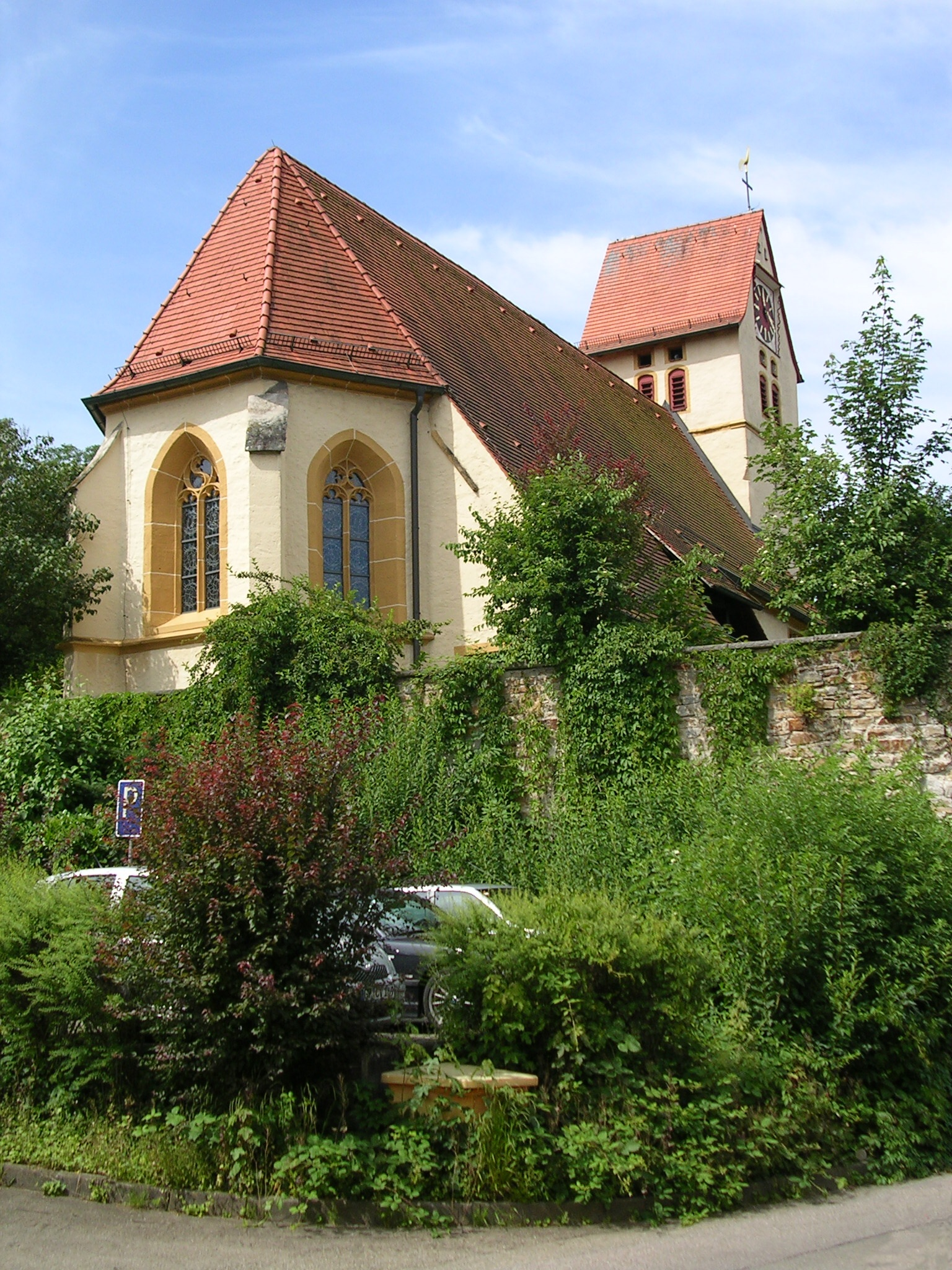
Evangelical church

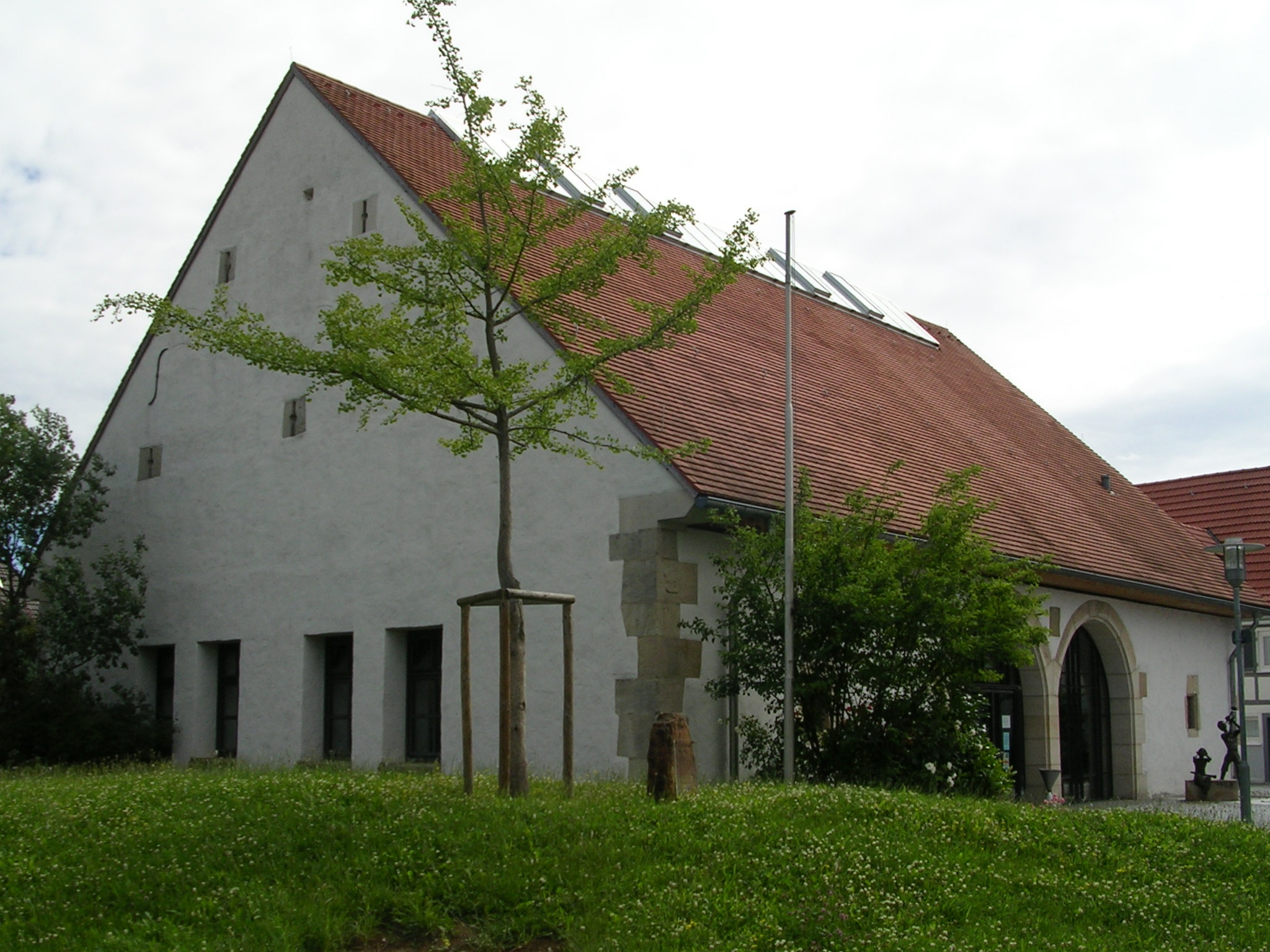
Zehntscheuer from 1580

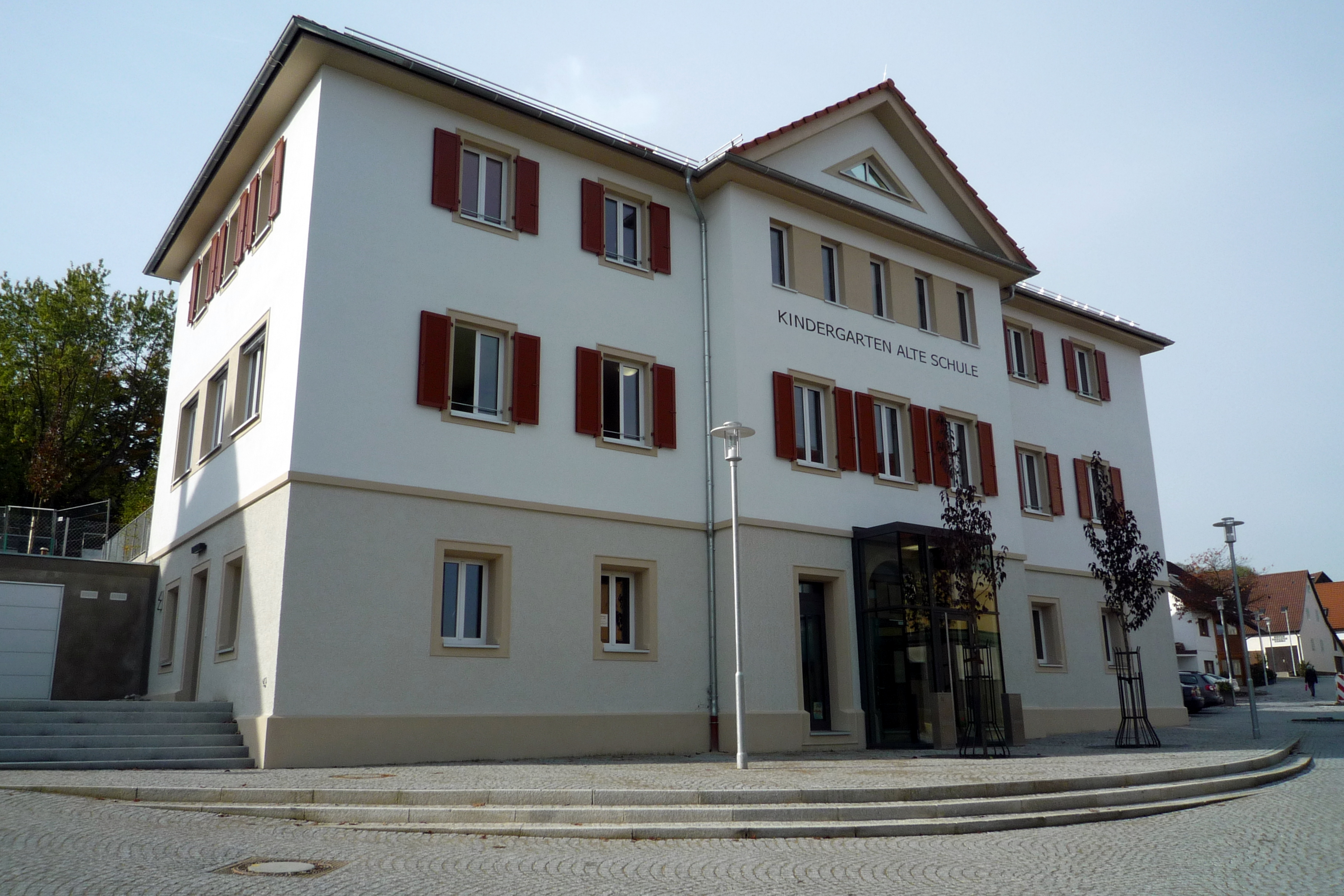
Old school house from 1845

=== Chronicle ===
When it was settled in the 8th century, the area belonged to the Lorsch Abbey an der Bergstraße. The settlement was mentioned for the first time as Dizinsowe in a deed of the monastery Sirnau in the year 1268. Back then there was the medieval castle Körschburg on the boundary of Deizisau. Their robber barons did attack the merchants on the trading road in the Neckar valley regularly. They were banished by Württemberg in 1292 and the castle was destroyed. The town itself belonged to the patrician family Bürgermeister from the free imperial city Esslingen since 1296 and did enter into the possession of the Esslinger Katharinenhospitals through purchase in the year 1411. The old church of Deizisau was broken down because of its unsafe condition in 1495. It was then replaced by today's Protestant church. Thereby the church tower which had been constructed as a fortified tower was taken over from the old church. In 1532 the Reformation was introduced in Deizisau through the Katharinenhospital.

In the second half of the 16. century Deizsau became posting house on the first continuously run post line in the Holy Roman Empire, which back then headed from Venice to Antwerp. The first namely known postmaster was in the year 1585 Carlin Taxis, who descended the postal entrepreneurial family Thurn und Taxis. Some of his descendants still live in Deizisau today which is why Taxis is one of the most common last names.

At the beginning of the 17th century it raged at first the black death, killing 31 people in 1608, then the mercenary arms of the Thirty Years' War. Had the town counted 275 inhabitants in 1618, only 140 people were alive in Deizisau at the end of the war. Even the posting house was lost again during this period.

Deizisau did belong to the domain of the free imperial city Esslingen since the Middle Ages. Because of the rearrangement of Germany by Napoleon as a consequence of the German mediatization it became württembergian. In the 19. century Deizisau was on the one hand spared from war destruction but instead, it suffered from severe famine. Only for a short time after the end of the Coalition Wars a worldwide climate disaster happened following the eruption of a volcano in Indonesia in 1816, the so-called Year Without a Summer. In Deizisau it rained for 75 days in a row, hail destroyed the fields and the little harvest left could partly only be brought in after Christmas. The consequence was one of the most severe famines in the history of Deizisau. More bad harvests followed in the years from 1852 to 1855. In total 135 citizens left the town in those four hunger years to emigrate to the United States. On a rise in the Rotfeld between Deizisau and Köngen the famines are still reminded of through the hunger lime planted in the year 1833.

In 1845 the first schoolhouse was built in Deizisau (nowadays a kindergarten), in 1908 a new one was built in Bismarck street. Nowadays the since then enhanced building complex contains the primary and common school.

"Sirnau", which until then belonged to Deizisau territory was traded against an annuity payment with Esslingen in 1928. The World War II and thereby the era of Nazism ended in Deizisau on April 22, 1945, with the march-in of the American troops.

Following the war a lot of expellees were accepted and integrated. The town developed from a town still heavily shaped by farming to a community with a lot of industry which was able to obtain its independence throughout the local government reorganizations of the seventies. Not least because of the strong communal self-confidence of its citizens.

=== Religion ===
From the reformation until the end of the Second World War, Deizisau was mostly evangelical. Thereafter, through the settlement of a lot of expellees, an additional Catholic community developed together with the neighboring village Altbach. The Catholic church Klemens-Maria-Hofbauer-Kirche was inaugurated in 1960. Moreover, Deizisau has a United Methodist church community, which has her Christ chapel in the Klingenstraße as house of prayer. The community of the Jehovah's Witnesses gathers itself in their Kingdom Hall in the Sirnauer Straße.

=== Demographics ===
The number are estimates, from 1850 until 1970 the result from censuses and since 1980 the result of official updates from the Statistical State Office Baden-Württemberg:

Year	Inhabitants
1618	275
1649	140
1700	372
1800	600
1850	1,007
1900	1,244
1925	1,623
1939	1,941
1950	2,709

Year	Inhabitants
1961	4,037
1970	6,131
1980	6,263
1990	6,269
1995	6,054
2000	6,387
2005	6,552
2010	6,420
2015	6,735

== Politics ==
=== Mayors since 1819 ===
The municipal administrators were called Schultheiße in Württemberg until 1930 and only afterwards referred to as Bürgermeister. Until 1898 the municipal administrators of Deizisau were Bauernschultheiße (farmers who additionally worked as municipal administrators). With the exception of the time directly at the end of the Second World War ever since then administration specialists headed the community.

- 1819–1821: Johann Christoph Winkeler
- 1822–1849: Andreas Brodwolf
- 1870–1878: Johann Christoph Gräßle
- 1878–1898: Johann Christoph Bienz
- 1898–1902: Christian Keim
- 1902–1920: Johannes Häußler
- 1920–1944: Gotthilf Kirchner
- 1945: Christian Müller
- 1945–1946: Wilhelm Bäuerle
- 1946–1948: Hermann Malmsheimer
- 1948–1985: Hermann Ertinger
- 1985–2009: Gerhard Schmid
- since 2009: Thomas Matrohs

=== Municipal council ===
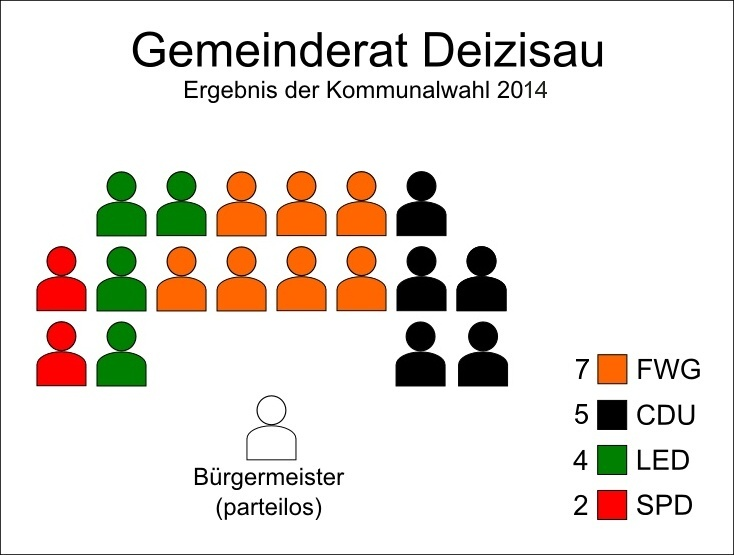
Seats in the Municipal Council

The municipal council of Deizisau has 18 members. The communal elections at the 25 May 2014 lead to the following official results:. The municipal council consists of the elected honorary council members and the mayor as its chairman. The mayor is entitled to vote.

Parties and election associations		%2014	Seats2014	%2009	Seats2009
FW	Freie Wählergemeinschaft Deizisau	35,59	7	34,15	6
CDU/BLD	Christlich Demokratische Union Deutschlands/Bürgerliste Deizisau	28,48	5	31,65	6
LED	Liste Engagierter DeizisauerInnen	22,78	4	21,39	4
SPD	Sozialdemokratische Partei Deutschlands	13,15	2	12,81	2
total		100.0	18	100.0	18
voter participation		56,08 %		62,93 %	

=== Heraldry ===
Blazoning: In a divided shield, in front in gold a red flag with three bibs, in the back in red a golden duck foot.

The from the observers side left part of the herald shows the banner of the County Palatine of Tübingen Tübingen. It is derived from the St. Katharinen-Spital in Esslingen, who not only possessed Deizisau for several centuries but additionally the villages Möhringen and Vaihingen a. d. Fildern taken over from the County Palatine of Tübingen. The origin of the duck leg on the right half of the herald on the other hand is unknown. The colours of the herald, red and gold, are the colours of the patrician family Bürgermeister von Deizisau, who owned Deizisau for a time during the Middle Ages.

=== Sister cities ===
Since 1991 an inner German partnership exists with Neukieritzsch in Saxony.

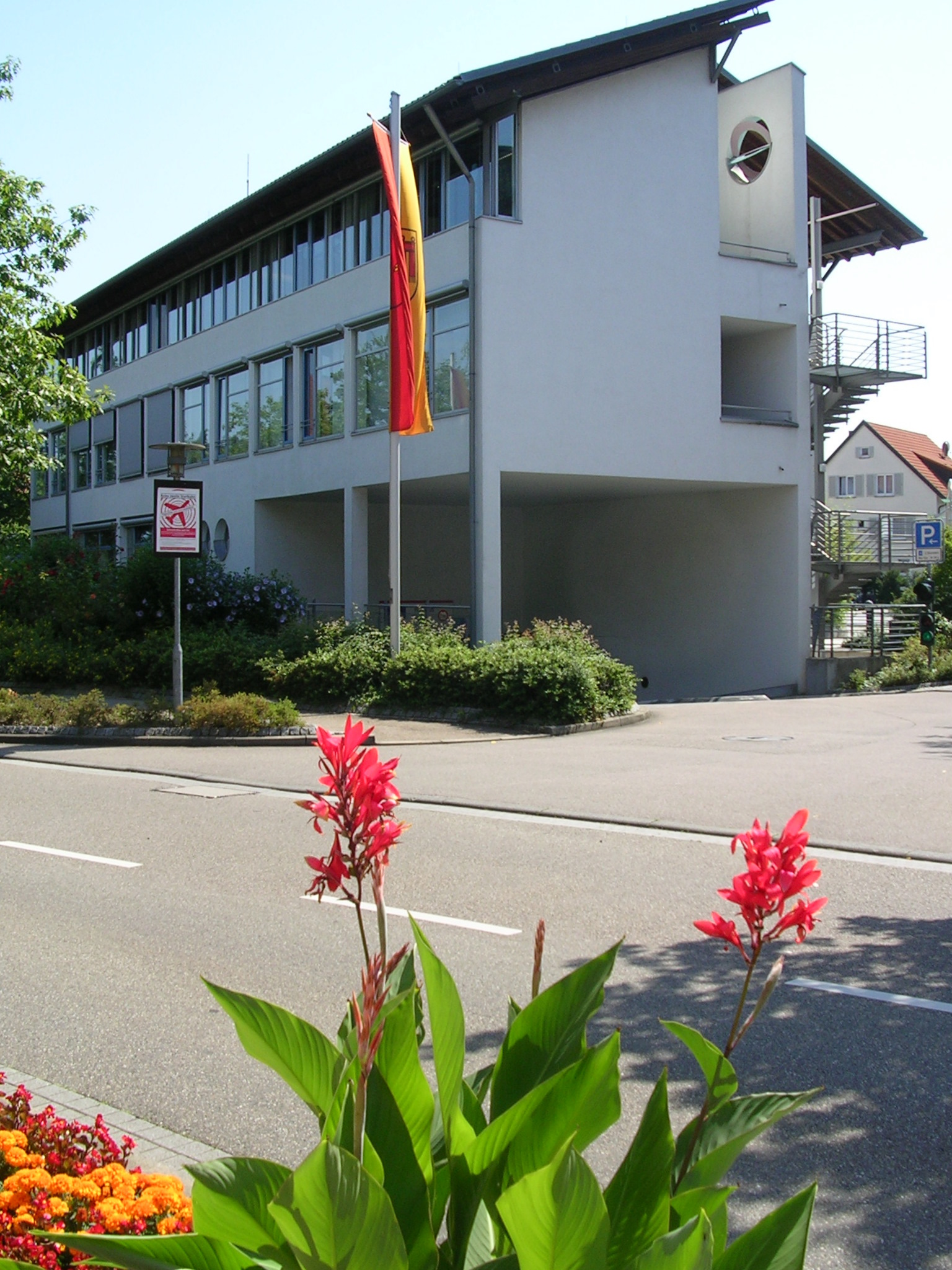
Deizisau Town Hall

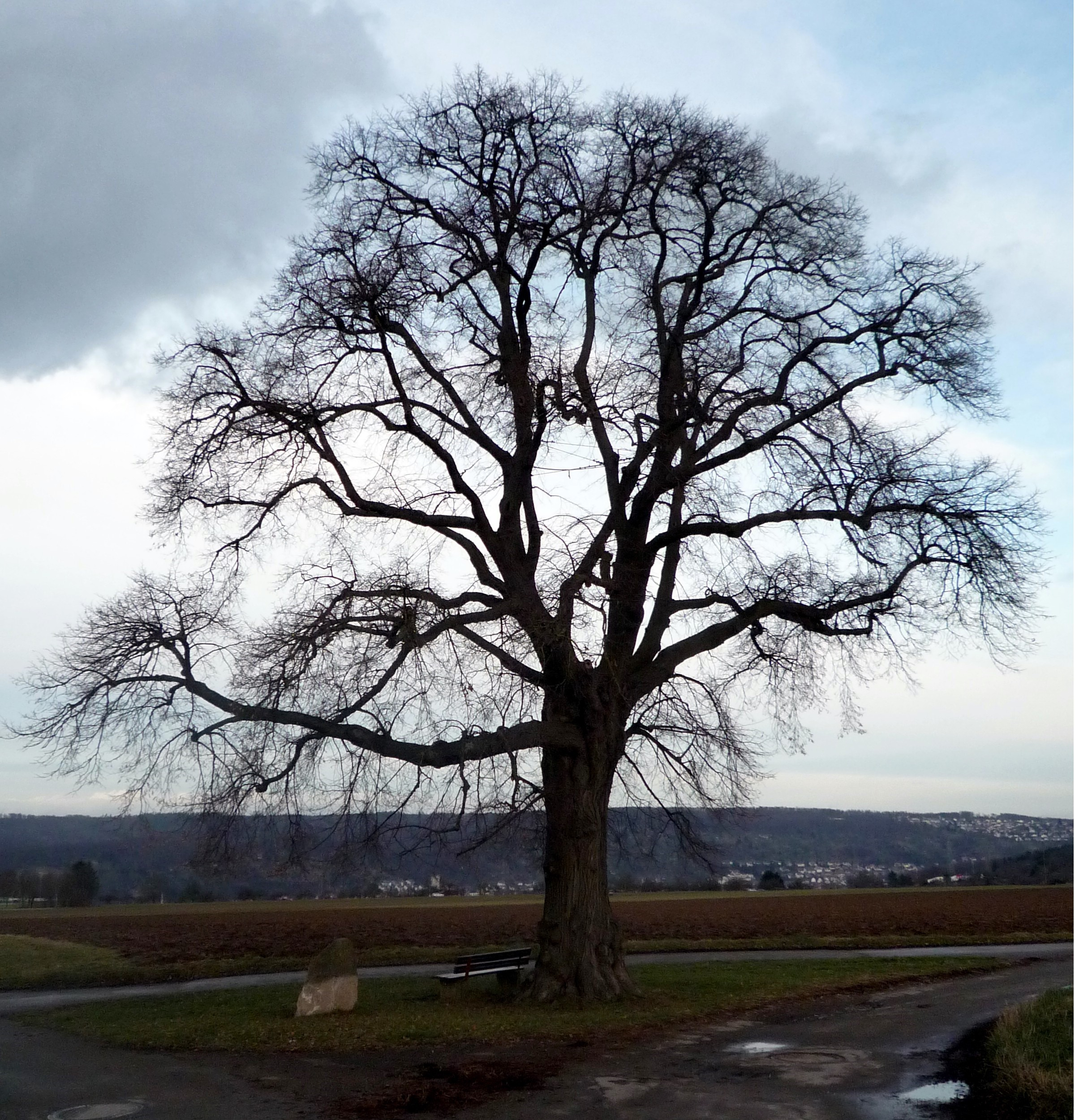
Hungerlinde (famine lime tree)

== Economy and infrastructure ==
=== Companies ===
- The combined heat and power station Altbach/Deizisau owned by Energie Baden-Württemberg AG (EnBW) with an electrical capacity of about 1200 Megawatt lays partly in Deizisau boundary.
- The Coca-Cola Erfrischungsgetränke AG has a production plant in Deizisau since 1957.
- The company Eheim is a leading producer of aquaria accessories which has its headquarter and production plant in Deizisau since 1957 (about 250 employees).
- The long-established company Friedr. Dick, a producer of files, knives and tools which has its headquarters in Deizisau since 1997. Roughly 180 people work there.
- The lathe Producer Index Werke from Esslingen did build a site in Deizisau in 1970. About 400 people work there since an expansion finished in 2013.
- The label and labelling-machine Producer Herma with headquarters in Filderstadt owns a production facility in Deizisau since 1965. The building, which has been expanded in 1989, is workplace for roughly 120 employees.
- JCC Ledermoden one of the leading importers of leather apparel is also located here. TopGun brand is distributed by them along with several other leading fashion brands.
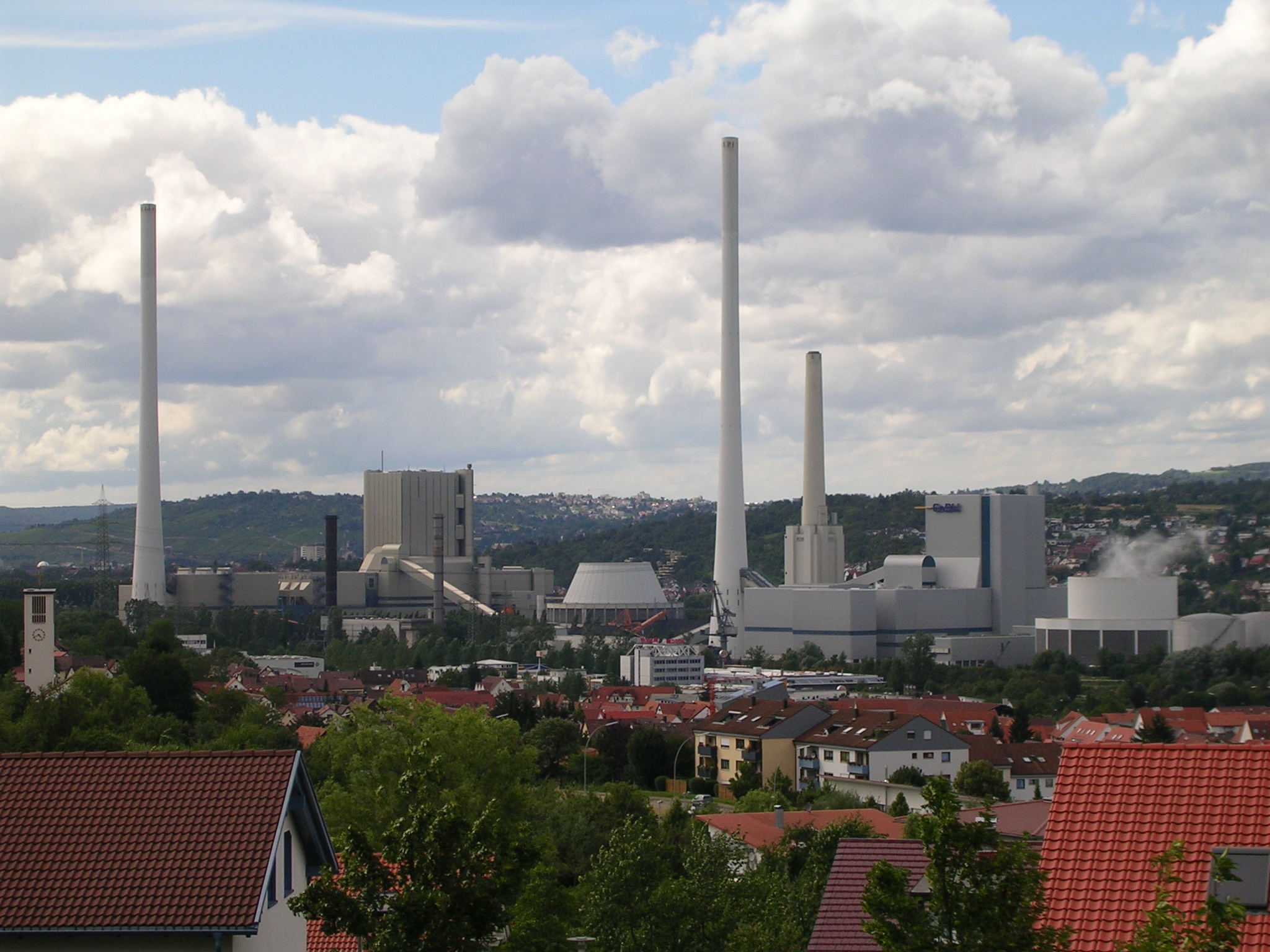
Heizkraftwerk Altbach/Deizisau

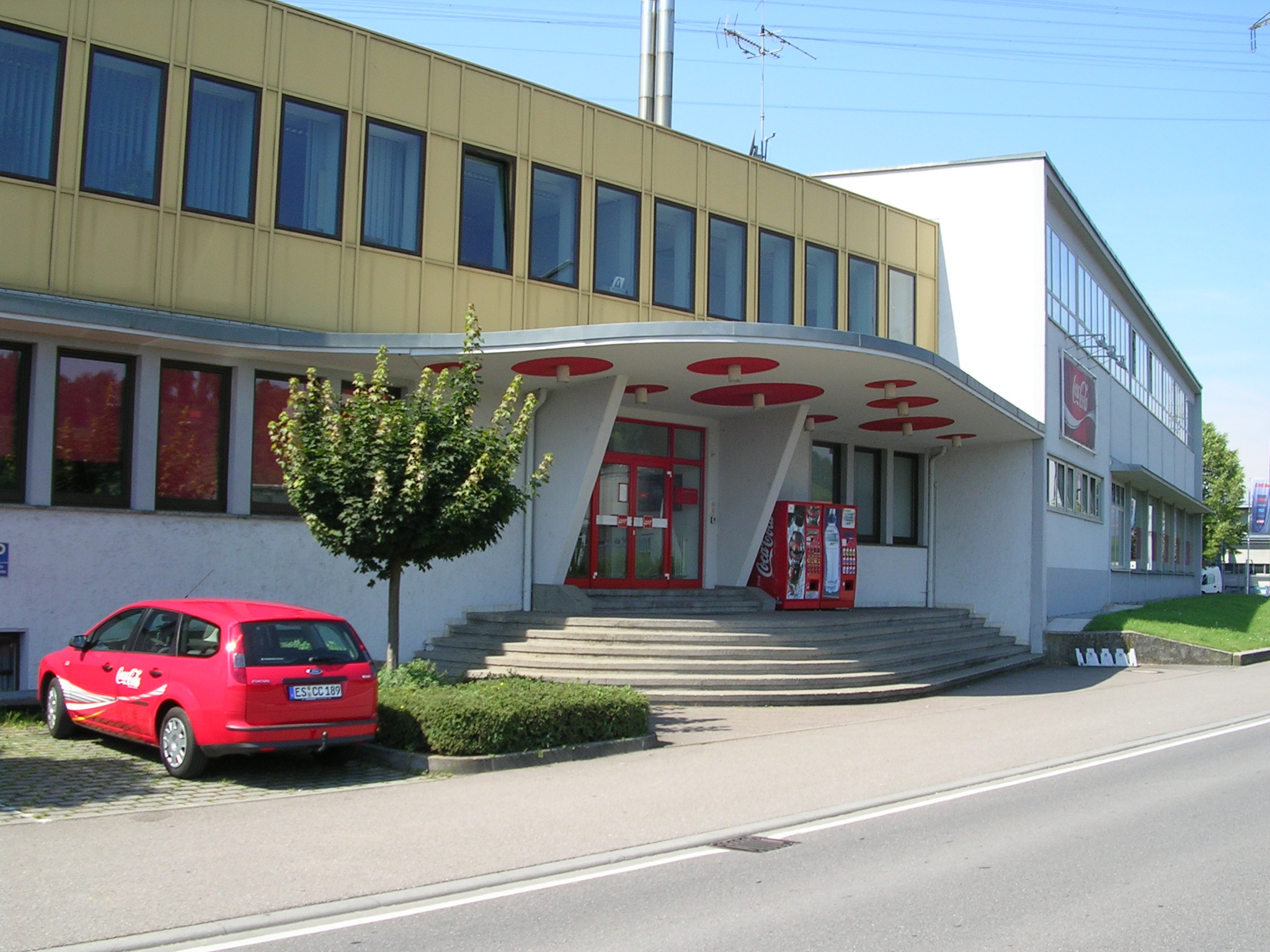
Coca-Cola-Werk

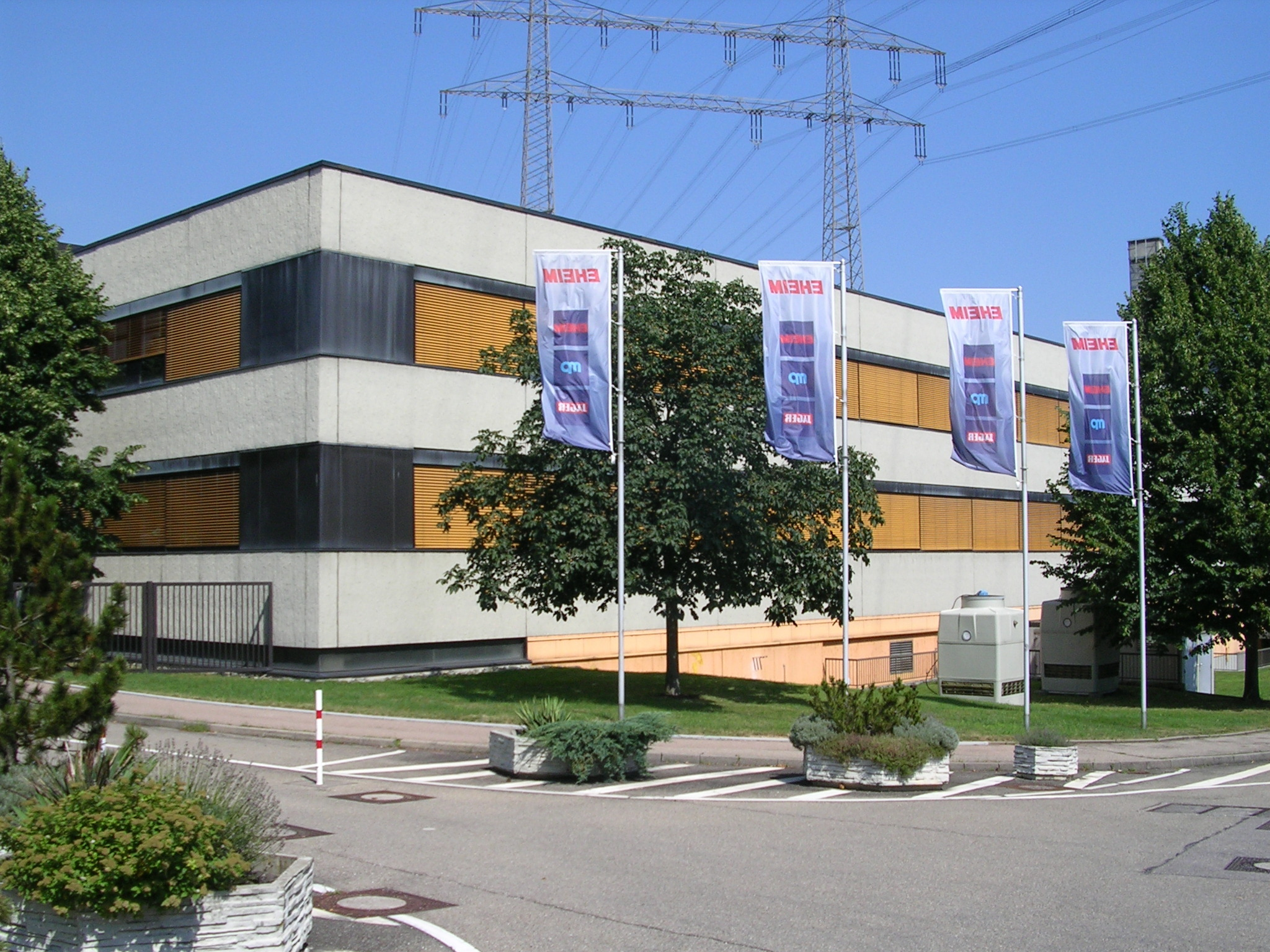
Firma Eheim

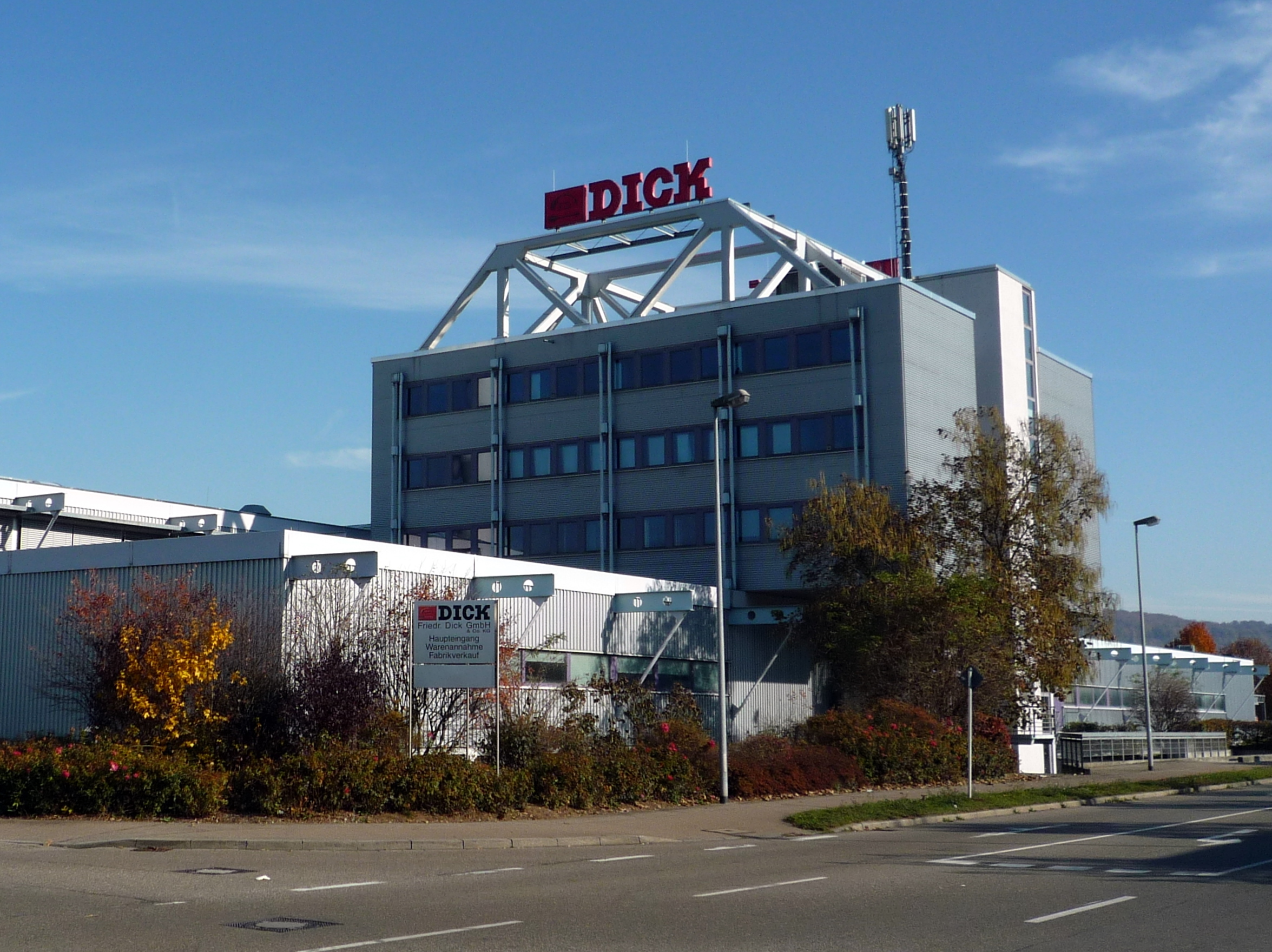
Firma Friedr. Dick

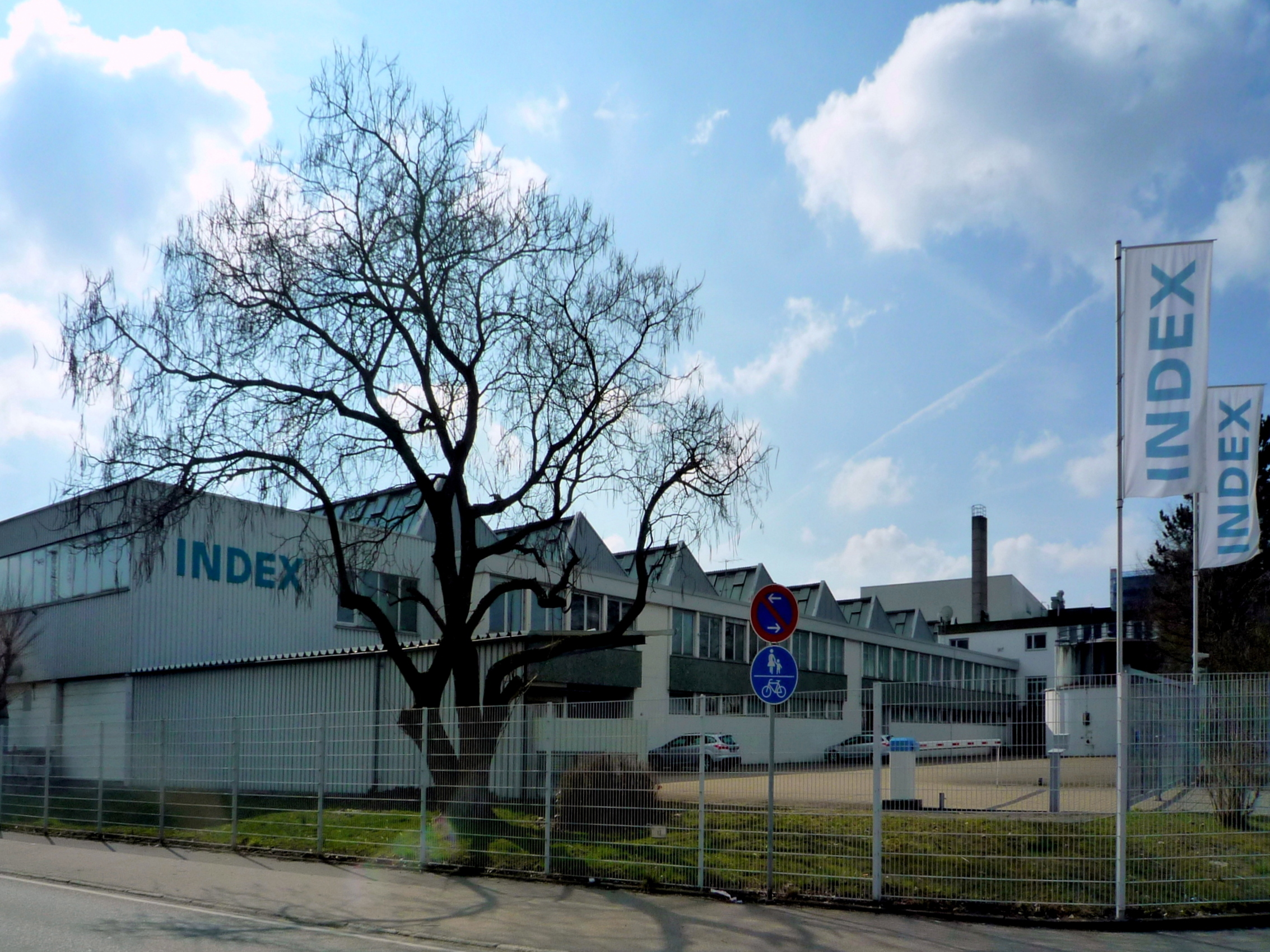
Firma Index

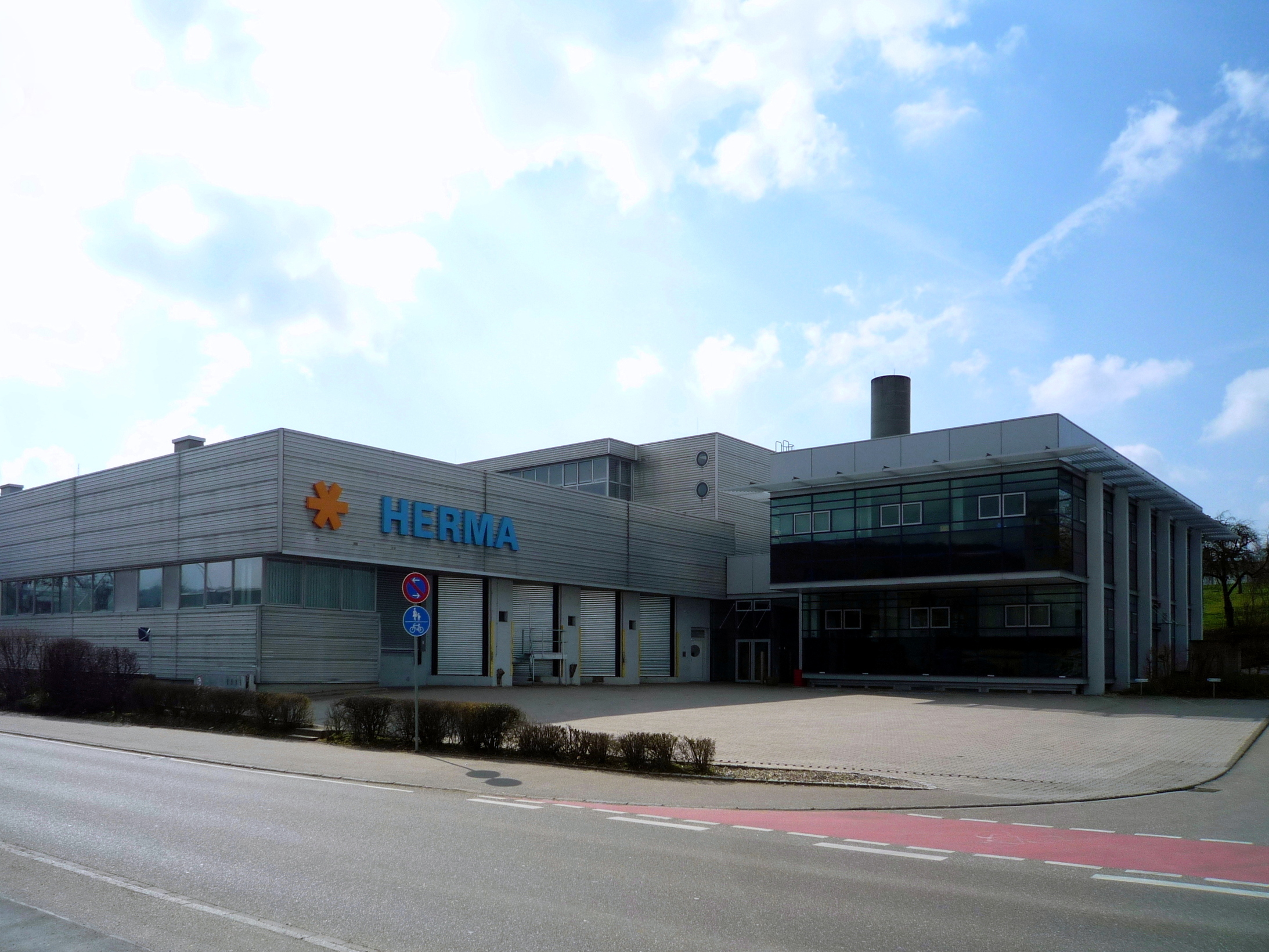
Firma Herma

=== Transportation ===
Deizisau has a good Connection to the traffic system through the Bundesstraße 10, the proximity to the Bundesautobahn 8 and direct access to the Stuttgart S-Bahn in the neighbouring towns Altbach and Plochingen. Additionally Plochingen Station is connected with frequent regional trains as well as several intercity connections. Right after the Station the main line Plochingen–Tübingen railway separates from the main line to Ulm and Munich, called the Fils Valley Railway. die Bundesstraße 10, die Nähe zur Bundesautobahn 8 und die Neckar-Schifffahrt. The local public transport is covered through the VVS bus lines 143 (to Plochingen) and 104 (to Esslingen). The Neckar river is made navigable to Plochingen Harbour by the Deizisau Barrage.

=== Education ===
Deizisau has a Primary School on which since School year 2013/2014 a Gemeinschaftsschule (non-denominational school) builds. The Folk high school Esslingen am Neckar has a branch in Deizisau.

=== Recreational and sports facilities ===
Small Sports center Hintere Halde: Football, Tennis and Outdoor Basketball fields.

In an area next to the Bundesstrasse 10: Hermann-Ertinger sports hall and Übungshalle, football field, public heated open-air pool (1938: first public open-air pool in the Eßlingen District)

Small school gymnasium, several small public football fields and playgrounds spread across the town.

The towns sport shooting club also offers shooting ranges in distances of 10, 15, 25 and 50 meters.

== Culture and sights ==
=== Buildings ===
==== Evangelical church ====
According to an inscription on its gallery the late gothic church was dedicated in 1495. This date is indeed not founded on documents, but a dentochronological research in 1982 showed that the wood used for the truss was cut between 1494 and 1495. The church tower dates back from a predecessor building first mentioned in 1353. Inside the church stands a Winged altarpiece from the last decade of the 15th century. The art historian Hans Rott awards it to the painter Matthias Ulin-Wolf dem Jüngeren († 1536) from Esslingen and states that until 1811 it belonged the Katharinenhospital Esslingen chapel, which was then torn down. The winged altarpiece shows on the inside the saints Agnes und Saint Christopher, on the outside the motif of the emission of the apostles. Moreover, worth watching are the four church windows designed by Hans Gotted von Stockhausen. The southern side window was inaugurated in 1961. The three chancel windows are from 1982.

==== Other buildings ====
- the Tithe barn ("Zehntscheuer") built in 1580.
- the old town hall dating back into the 17th century.
- the old classical school house from 1845.

=== Regular events ===
- Deizisauer Hauptfest mit Kinderfest. This festival with parades of the clubs and school, musical performances and a lampion parade on Monday evening at the end has been held regularly since 1924. Nowadays it always takes place the weekend before the summer holidays and usually starts with a Friday evening event in the festival tent for those who do voluntary work in town and is officially opened on Saturday by the current mayor. Although only the Monday is officially the Kinderfest (child festival) day with special stages like trunk climbing and chocolate marshmallow catapult organized for them, many people in the area refer to the entire weekend as the "(Deizisauer) Kinderfest".
- Every second advent Sunday a Christmas market is held in Deizisau..
- From 1997 until 2015 Deizisau annually hosted the International Neckar-Open – the at that time largest chess tournament in Germany.

== Personalities ==
=== Honorary citizen ===
- 1982: Albert Seifried (1913-1982), town council and 1st deputy mayor
- 1985: Hermann Ertinger (1920-1997), mayor
- 1996: Julius Staufner (1931-2001), local council and 1st deputy mayor

=== Sons and daughters of the community ===
- August Zoller (1773-1858), pastor in Deizisau 1798–1811, an important Württemberg educator
- Edgar Wolff (born 1959), politician, since 2009 district councilor of Göppingen

=== Personalities who have lived or worked in Deizisau ===
People who were not born in Deizisau, but lived or live in Deizisau:

- Ludwig Hetsch (1806-1872), composer of spiritual and romantic songs, married in Deizisau and acquired the Deizisauer civil right
- Gotthilf Fischer (1928–2020), born in Plochingen, choral conductor, grew up in Deizisau
- Bernd Förster (born 1956), footballer among others for Bayern Munich and VfB Stuttgart, player of the Germany national team, living in Deizisau since 1981
