= Gotthilf Fischer =

German choral conductor (1928–2020)

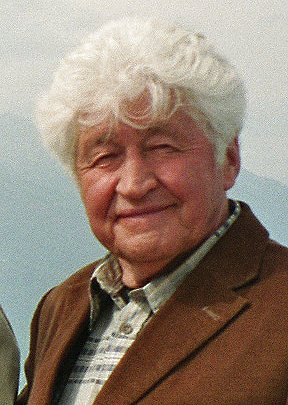
- Fischer in 2006
- Born: Gerhard Albert Gotthilf Fischer; 11 February 1928; Plochingen, Germany
- Died: 11 December 2020 (aged 92); Weinstadt, Germany
- Occupation: Choral conductor
- Organizations: Fischer-Chöre

Gotthilf Fischer (11 February 1928 – 11 December 2020) was a German choral conductor. He was known for founding the Fischer-Chöre, mass choirs to perform mostly Volkslieder and popular music. They appeared internationally, including for presidents of state and popes, and in large size for the opening of the Olympic Summer Games 1972 in Munich, and of the 1974 FIFA World Cup. They sold more than 16 million records.

== Life ==
Gerhard Albert Gotthilf Fischer was born in Plochingen, Swabia. He was the son of a carpenter who made music in his free time. He was trained to be a sports teacher at the Lehrerbildungsanstalt in Esslingen from 1942 to 1945. As a choral conductor, he was self-taught. From 1946, he conducted the Concordia Gesangverein choir in Deizisau, later also other groups in the Esslingen district. Concordia won first prize at the Schwäbischen Sängerfest in Göppingen where 150 choirs competed in the category Volks- und Kunstgesang (Volkslied and art song). It sparked the founding of more groups which appeared combined as the Fischer-Chöre, with occasionally around 1,500 singers.

Fischer made his television debut in 1962 in Horst Jankowski's series Sing mit Horst. The Fischer-Chöre appeared on TV first in 1969 in Wim Thoelke's series Drei mal Neun, making them popular across Germany. The Fischer-Chöre sang in large size for the opening of the Olympic Summer Games 1972 in Munich. At the final of the 1974 FIFA World Cup, the Fischer-Chöre performed with 1,500 singers the song "Das große Spiel" with Freddy Quinn, for 80,000 in the stadium and millions watching on television around the world. Fischer then toured across Europe and the United States. From 1995 to 2008, Fischer ran a television series entitled Straße der Lieder (Road of songs) for the broadcaster SWR. He was called "Karajan aus dem Remstal" (Karajan from Rems valley) and "Herr der singenden Heerschaaren" (Lord of the singing hosts). His choirs performed for royals, presidents of state and several popes. During 75 years as a choral conductor, he sold more than 16 million records, many of them titled Sing mit Fischer (Sing with Fischer).

Fischer died in Weinstadt at age 92.
