= Deutsche Digitale Bibliothek =

German digital library

- Website type: virtual library
- Available in: German, English
- Owners: cooperative project by the Federal Republic of Germany, the German states and German municipalities
- Website: www.deutsche-digitale-bibliothek.de
- Registration: optional
- Launched: November 2012

The Deutsche Digitale Bibliothek (German Digital Library) or DDB is a virtual library in the German language which networks 30,000 cultural and research institutions and aims to make them freely accessible to the public using a common platform. A beta version of the portal with, according to its own information, about 5.6 million objects, went online on 28 November 2012. The first full version was launched on 31 March 2014. The aim is to integrate the DDB into Europeana at the European level.

== Literature ==
- Manfred Dworschak (8 February 2010). "Babylonischer Bau". Der Spiegel (in German). pp. 142–144. Archived from the original on 20 August 2014. "Die Deutsche Digitale Bibliothek will Millionen Bücher, Filme, Bilder und Tonaufnahmen im Internet zugänglich machen. Über 30.000 Bibliotheken, Museen und Archive sollen ihr digitalisiertes Kulturgut beisteuern. Kann ein derart ehrgeiziger Plan überhaupt gelingen?"
