= Günter Wewel =

German operatic bass and television presenter (1934–2023)

- Günter Wewel, in the 1990s
- Born: 29 November 1934; Arnsberg, Germany
- Died: 9 May 2023 (aged 88); Arnsberg, Germany
- Education: Dortmund Conservatory
- Occupations: Operatic bass; television presenter
- Organisations: Oper Dortmund; ARD
- Known for: Kein schöner Land
- Title: Kammersänger
- Awards: Order of Merit of the Federal Republic of Germany; Hermann-Löns-Medaille; Order of Merit of North Rhine-Westphalia; Goldene Europa
- Website: www.guenter-wewel.de

Günter Wewel (German: [ˈɡʏntɐ ˈveːvl̩]; 29 November 1934 – 9 May 2023) was a German operatic bass and television presenter. Based at the Opernhaus Dortmund for decades, he performed 80 roles in Germany and Europe. He is known for presenting the television series Kein schöner Land, with more than 150 episodes from 1989 to 2007, which portrays regions in Europe, their landscape, people and folklore, the first such show filmed at the locations.

== Early life ==
Wewel was born in Arnsberg. After school, he first trained as a civil servant with the Deutsche Bundesbahn. He then studied voice, especially opera, at the Dortmund Conservatory. He studied further with Rudolf Watzke in Dortmund and Johannes Kobeck in Vienna.

== Career ==
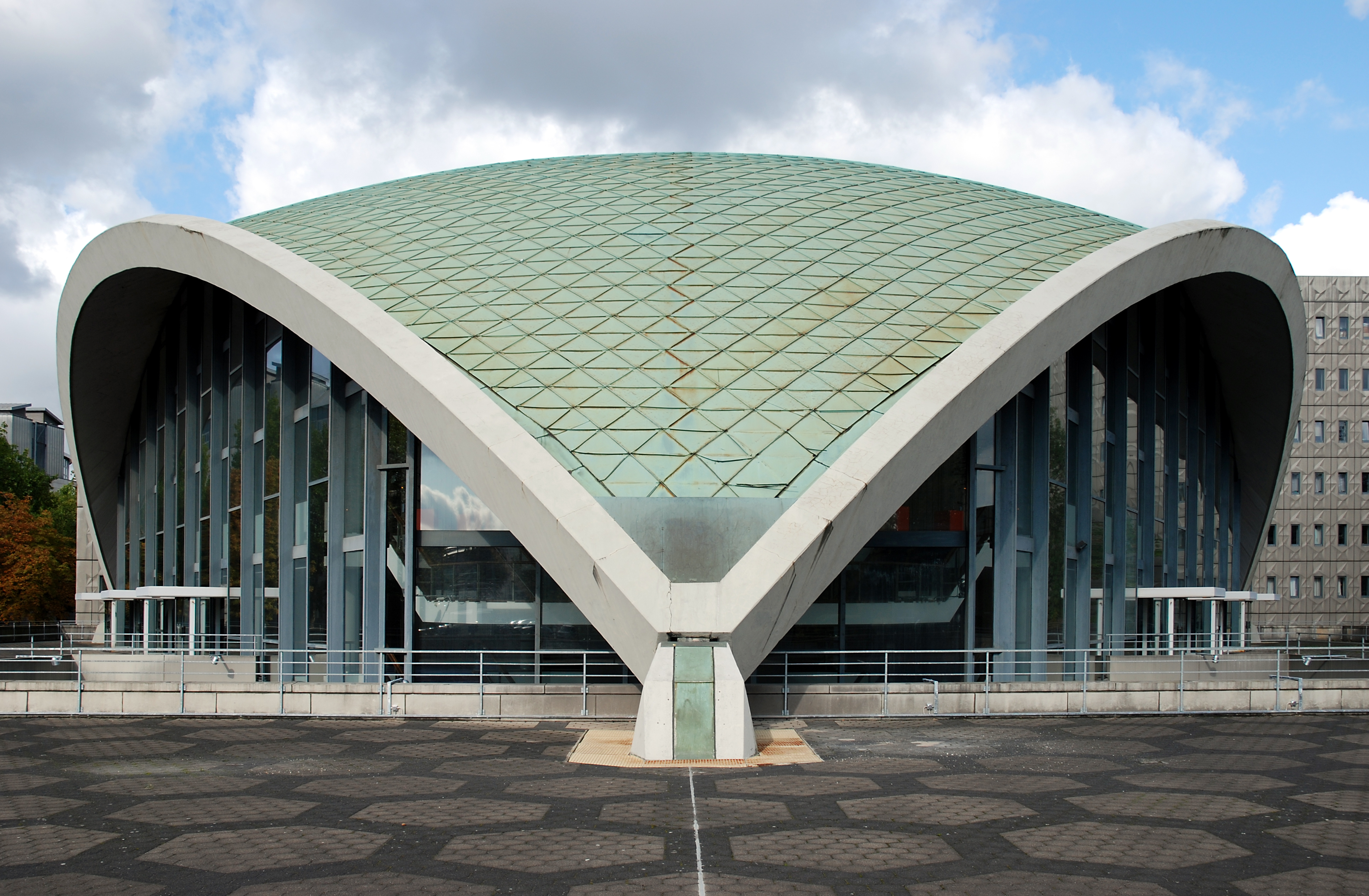
Opernhaus Dortmund

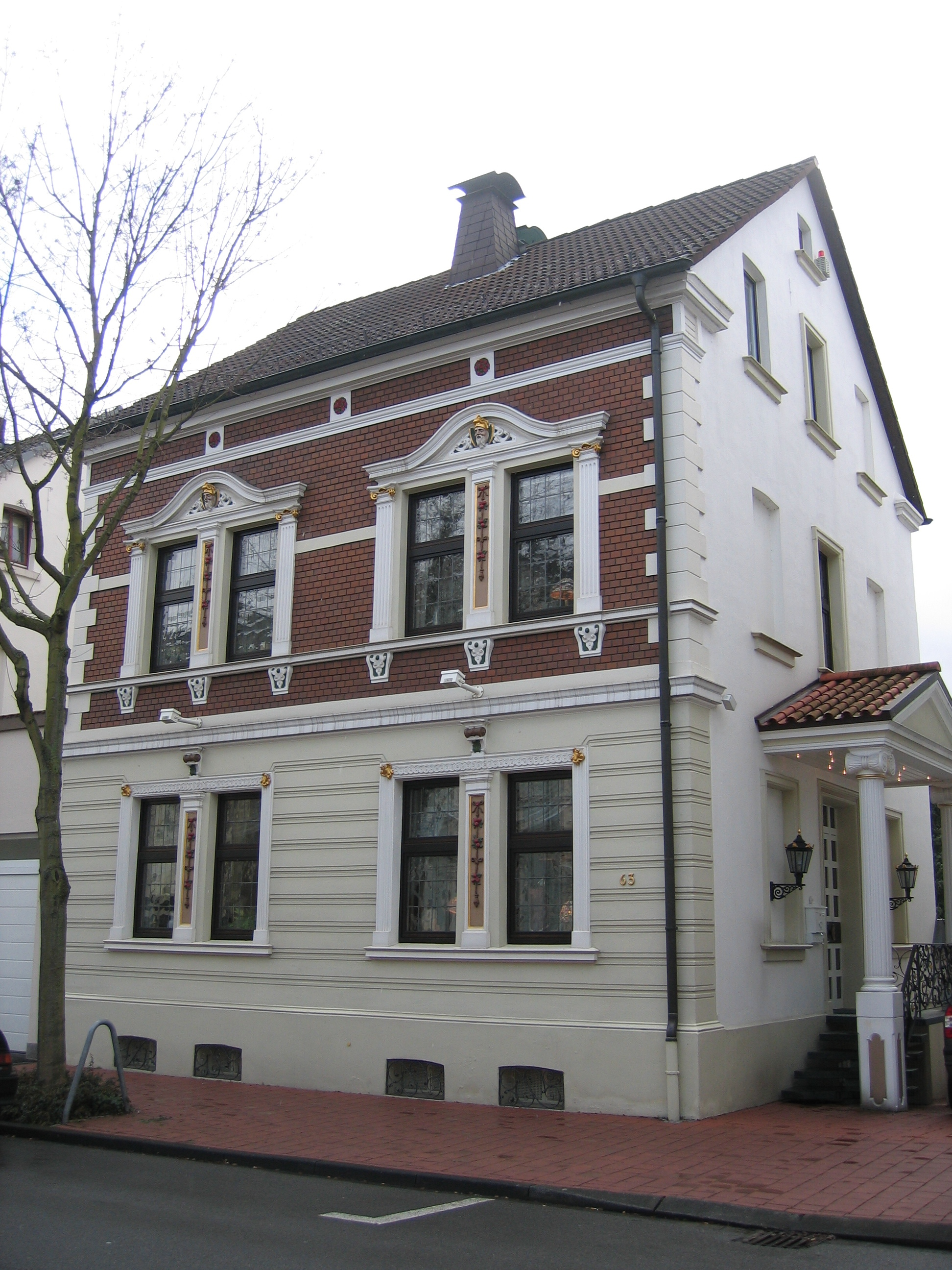
Wewel's residence in Arnsberg

Wewel was a member of the Oper Dortmund from 1963, with Generalmusikdirektor Wilhelm Schüchter, and remained at the house throughout his career of more than 30 years. From 1965, he appeared as a guest in Germany at the Bavarian State Opera, the Hamburg State Opera, the Staatstheater Stuttgart, the Deutsche Oper am Rhein, the Cologne Opera and Staatstheater Hannover, among others. In Europe, he performed at the Budapest National Opera, in Paris, Strasbourg, Bordeaux, Rouen, Salzburg and the Opernhaus Zürich.

Wewel performed over 80 roles, including Mozart's Osmin in Die Entführung aus dem Serail, the Komtur in Don Giovanni and Sarastro in Die Zauberflöte, Rocco in Beethoven's Fidelio, Philipp II in Verdi's Don Carlo, Gremin in Tchaikovsky's Eugen Onegin, Wagner's Daland in Der fliegende Holländer, Heinrich in Lohengrin, Marke in Tristan und Isolde and Titurel in Parsifal. He also performed in operettas. In the mid-1980s he appeared as Landgrave Hermann in a complete recording of Wagner's Tannhäuser from the Theater Saarbrücken. He was awarded the title Kammersänger in 1989.

From 1989 to 2007, Wewel was the presenter of the musical entertainment television programme Kein schöner Land. The series ran at irregular intervals, with more than 150 episodes in total, and was produced by Saarländischer Rundfunk. Wewel took his guests to different regions of Europe and presented people, landscapes and customs. The musical part of the programme ranged from folklore typical for the region to hits, folk music and light classical music, to which Wewel often contributed songs. It was the first music programme on German television filmed at the original locations and not in the studio.

In addition to his opera work, he also recorded numerous Volkslieder.

=== Personal life ===
Wewel was married to Gisela Wewel from 1959; she died on 20 September 2014 at age 76.

Wewel died in Arnsberg on 9 May 2023, at age 88.

== Honours ==
- 1989: Kammersänger
- 1992: Order of Merit of the Federal Republic of Germany
- 1992: Hermann-Löns-Medaille
- 1996: Order of Merit of North Rhine-Westphalia
- 1999: Goldene Europa
- 1999: Ring of honour of his hometown Arnsberg

== Recordings ==
=== Hits ===
- 1979: "Ihr mögt den Rhein" (Westfalenlied)
- 1987: "Alle Tage ist kein Sonntag"
- 1987: "Müde kehrt ein Wandersmann zurück"
- 1992: "Die wilde Jagd"
- 1994: "Es dunkelt schon in der Heide"
- 1998: "Auf auf, zum fröhlichen Jagen"

=== Albums ===
==== Opera ====
- Schumann: Das Paradies und die Peri
- Mozart: Die Zauberflöte as 2. Geharnischter
- Mendelssohn: Die beiden Pädagogen
- Humperdinck: Königskinder
- Wagner: Tannhäuser as Landgraf
- Norbert Schultze: Das kalte Herz

==== Operetta ====
Wewel recorded some complete operettas, and excerpts conducted by Heinz Wallberg and Willi Boskovsky, alongside soprano Anneliese Rothenberger and baritone Hermann Prey, among others.

- 1981 Millöcker: Gasparone (excerpts)
- 1982 Offenbach: Pariser Leben
- 1987 Suppé: Boccaccio as Checchio (excerpts)
- 1984 Lehár: Giuditta as Martini
- 1987 Suppé: Boccaccio as Checchio

==== Songs ====
- 1980: Wo man Bier trinkt – Songs for cheerful drinking culture
- 1989: Ein russisches Märchen – Die schönsten russischen Volkslieder
- 1994: Kein schöner Land
- 1998: Jagd- und Waldlieder
- Wer die Heimat liebt – Die schönsten Heimatlieder Deutschlands
