= Anton Wilhelm von Zuccalmaglio =

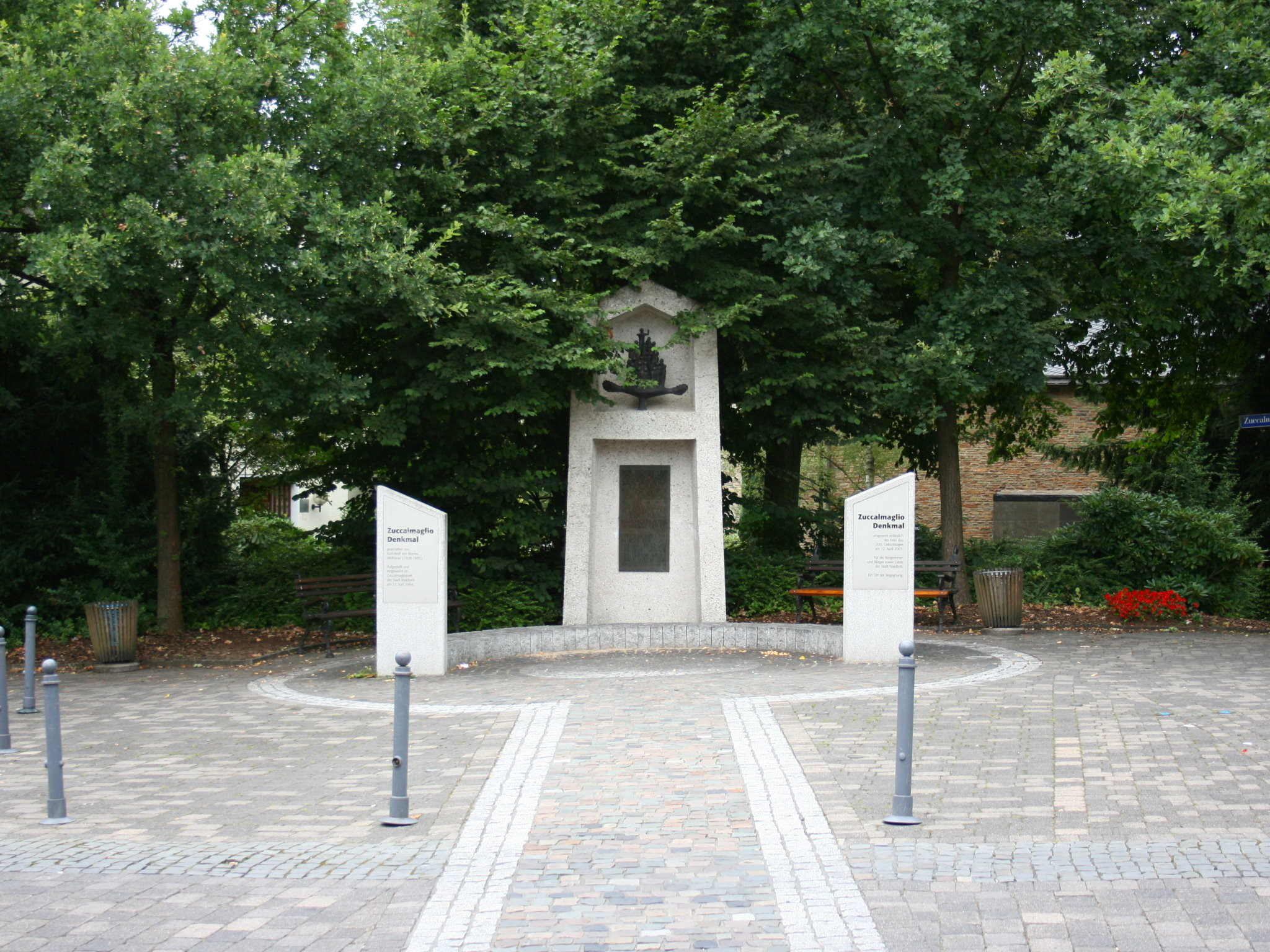
Zuccalmaglio Memorial, Waldbröl.

Anton Wilhelm Florentin von Zuccalmaglio (12 April 1803 – 23 March 1869) was a German dialectologist, folklorist, folk-song collector, poet, and composer. Born in Waldbröl, he was one of six children born to politician and jurist Jakob Salentin von Zuccalmaglio and Clara Deycks. His brother Vinzenz Jakob von Zuccalmaglio was a successful writer and poet. The Von Zuccalmaglio family traced its ancestry to Italians who had settled in the Catholic Rhineland region of Germany in centuries past.

The song "Kein schöner Land in dieser Zeit" (No more beautiful country in this time [these times]) was published by him as titled Abendlied (Evening Song) in 1840. It was one of many in a collection of Volkslieder (folk songs), but in fact Anton Wilhelm von Zuccalmaglio himself is the author of "Kein schöner Land". One of those words is confusing even to some German native speakers, as "schöner" is here a shortened form of "kein schöneres Land ...", ′not one land/country (being) more beautiful ...′. The song continues to be found in almost every collection of traditional German songs.

He died at Haus Nachrodt near Altena.
