= Goby Eberhardt =

German violinist, teacher and composer

Goby Eberhardt (Frankfurt, 29 March 1852 – Lübeck, 13 September 1926) was a German violinist, teacher and composer.

== Life ==
He studied with Friedrich Wilhelm Dietz a pupil of Spohr and later with Wilhelmj. He started his career at the age of 12. He was leader of famous orchestras: Berna (1870), Bremen (1872), Hamburg (1880). After a stroke in 1900 he concentrated in teaching

== Works ==
=== Pedagogical works ===
- Violin-Cursus (Magdeburg, 1901)
- Violin Schule: neue Methodik (Leipzig, 1905–8)
- Die ersten Übungen im Violinspiel (Leipzig, 1907)
- Materialen für den Anfangsunterricht (Leipzig, 1907)
- Mein System des Übens für Violine und Klavier auf psycho-physiologischer Grundlage (Dresden, 1907)
- Schule der Doppelgriffe (Leipzig, 1907)
- Schule der Geläufigkeit (Berlin, 1907)
- Tägliche Violin-Übungen für Anfänger (Berlin, 1907)
- Tägliche Violinübungen für die Verbindung schwieriger Doppelgriffe (Leipzig, 1907)
- Virtuosen Schule für Violine auf Grund des neuen Systems (Leipzig, 1908)
- Studienmaterial zum neuen System des Übens (Dresden, 1909)
- Tägliche Übungen in verschiedenen Intervallen (Leipzig, ?1923–4)
- Der natürliche Weg zur höchsten Virtuosität (Leipzig, 1923–4)(with S. Eberhardt)

== Sources ==
- Alfred Grant Goodman's article in New Grove Dictionary of Music
