= Württemberger Weinstraße =

Scenic route in Baden-Württemberg, Germany

Logo of the tour

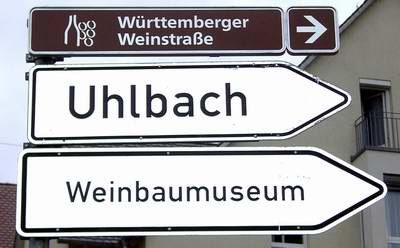
Leading-sign

The Württemberger Weinstraße (also Württemberg Wine Route) is a Holiday Route through the Wine Growing Area Württemberg that begins in Niederstetten-Oberstetten, via Weikersheim (near Bad Mergentheim), Heilbronn, Ludwigsburg and Stuttgart to Metzingen. The southern end point of the Württemberger Wine Route is the Kressbronn wine growing exclave on Lake Constance.

The 511-kilometre-long tourist road begins in the north in Weikersheim and leads through the Württemberg wine-growing regions on the banks of the Tauber, Kocher rivers, Jagst, Neckar, Sulm, Lein, Zaber, Schozach, Bottwar and Rems to the seven-press town of Metzingen in the south.

An exclave of the Württemberger Weinstrasse is Kressbronn on Lake Constance, where Württemberger wines are cultivated beyond the state border as far as Lindau. The route leads through all Württemberg wine regions and passes many sights. On October 13, 2004, the new wine route was officially inaugurated in Tripsdrill.

The Württemberger Weinstraße is the successor of the previous Swabian Wine Route, but with a revised route. In the east the "Remstal-Route" has been integrated.

On April 12, 2007, the route was extended: It now leads from Stuttgart-Münster directly to Stuttgart city centre and then back to Bad Cannstatt.

== Course ==
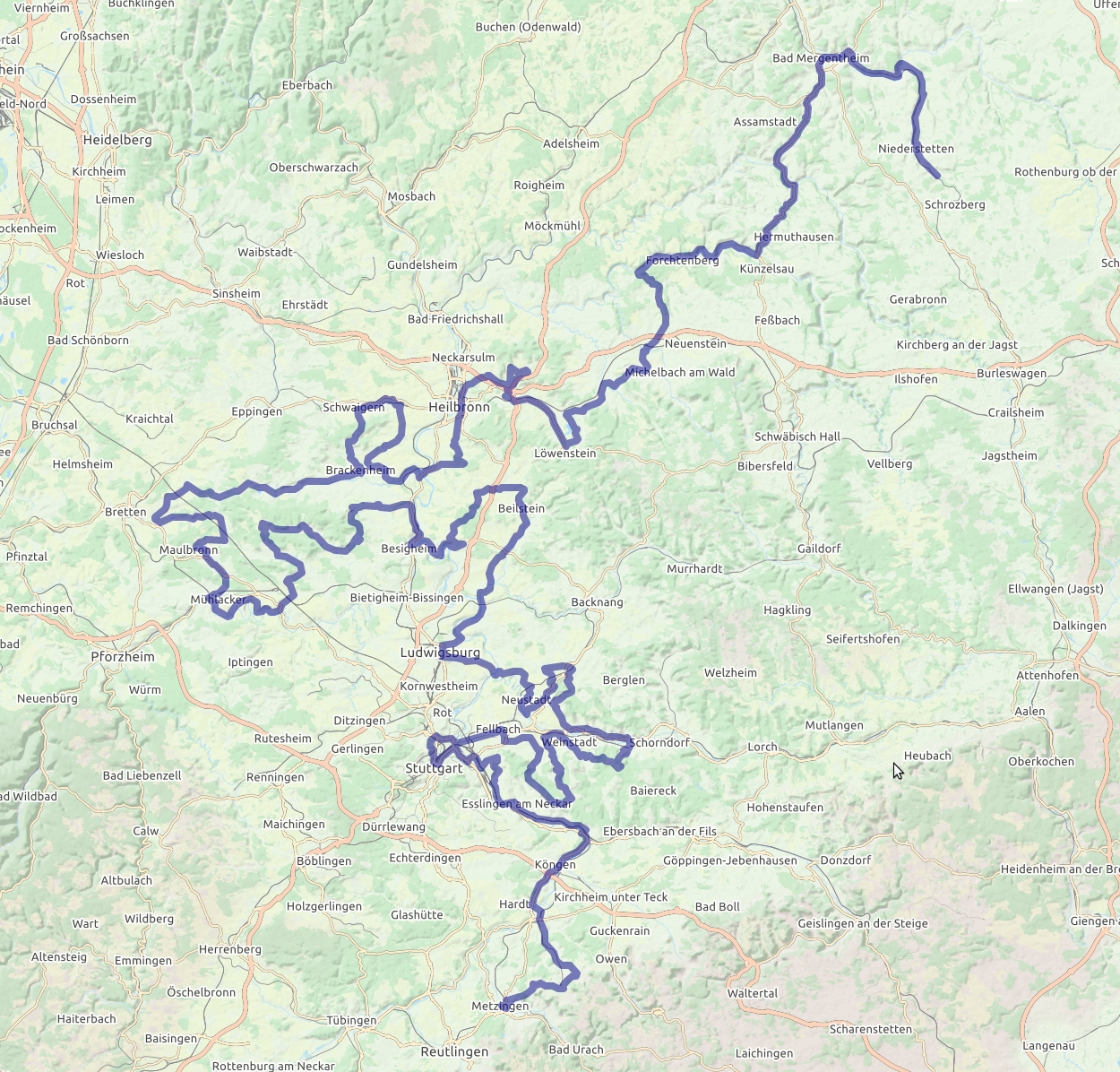
The Course - click to zoom

(Info of the regional council Stuttgart from April 1, 2004)

- Start: Start in Oberstetten at Niederstetten to Weikersheim Castle from there on the country road 2251 to Markelsheim - Igersheim
- from Igersheim on the Bundesstraße 19 via Bad Mergentheim - Stuppach - Dörzbach - Stachenhausen to Ingelfingen;
- from Ingelfingen on the country road 1045 to Criesbach - Niedernhall - Weißbach - Forchtenberg;
- before Sindringen on the country road 1050 to Zweiflingen - Öhringen - Pfedelbach;
- from Pfedelbach on the district road 2347 to Windischenbach on the country road 1035 to Adolzfurt - Eschenau - Affaltrach, on the district road 2123 to Weiler and on the 2108 to Reisach and from there on the district road 2106 to Löwenstein;
- from Löwenstein on the Bundesstraße 39 to Willsbach - Ellhofen - Weinsberg;
- from Weinsberg on the state road 1036 to Eberstadt, from there on the district road 2005 to Gellmersbach, via the district road 2126 to Erlenbach - Binswangen and further on the state road 1101 to Neckarsulm;
- from Neckarsulm on the Bundesstraße 27 to Heilbronn;
- from Heilbronn on the state road 1100 to Flein, direction Ilsfeld, halfway along the district road 2155 to Talheim and Lauffen;
- from Lauffen via the state road 1103 and district road 2074 to Hausen and Dürrenzimmern;
- from Dürrenzimmern on the state road 1106 to Nordhausen - Nordheim;
- from Nordheim on the state road 1105 to Großgartach - Leingarten;
- from Leingarten on the Bundesstraße 293 to Schwaigern and from there via the district road 2151 to Neipperg and Brackenheim;
- from Brackenheim on the main road 1103 to Frauenzimmern - Güglingen - Pfaffenhofen - Zaberfeld - Sternenfels - Oberderdingen;

on the state road 554 via Großvillars to Knittlingen K 4515-K 4518 - Hohenklingen - K4517 - Freudenstein - K 4516 to Diefenbach;

- from Diefenbach on the state road 1134 to Zaisersweiher and via the state road 1131 to Maulbronn; via the federal road 35 to Lienzingen - L 1134 Mühlacker-Eckenweiher L 1134/Osttangente/B 10 L 1134 K 4505 Mühlacker-Lomersheim junction Mühlacker-Mühlhausen K 4505 K1648 Vaihingen-Roßwag;
- from Roßwag via district road 1148 to Vaihingen an der Enz and via Bundesstraße 10 and state roads 1125 and 1106 to Ensingen and Horrheim;
- from Horrheim via the state road 1131 to Gündelbach;
- from Gündelbach via the district road 1644 to Häfnerhaslach and via the 1642 to Ochsenbach, continue on the country road 1110 to Hohenhaslach, on the country road 1106 from Hohenhaslach to Freudental Direction Bönnigheim, before Bönnigheim on the district road 1632 and 2269 to Tripsdrill; from there on the district road 1680 to Bönnigheim;
- from Bönnigheim via the district road to Hohenstein and Kirchheim, on the Bundesstraße 27 from Kirchheim via Walheim to Besigheim, via the district road 1677 to Hessigheim and Mundelsheim;
- from Mundelsheim via the district road 1700 on the state road 1115 in the direction of Ottmarsheim, from Ottmarsheim via the district road 1621, 2085 and 2156 to Ilsfeld, on the state road 1105 to Auenstein and via the district road 2089 to Helfenberg - Söhlbach - Beilstein;
- from Beilstein on the state road 1100 to Oberstenfeld - Großbottwar - Steinheim an der Murr - Marbach am Neckar - Neckarweihingen and on the 1124 to Ludwigsburg;
- from Ludwigsburg on the federal highway 27 via the state road 1140 to Neckarrems, Hohenacker and Neustadt, on the state road 1909 to Waiblingen and via the district road 1911 to Winnenden,
- from Winnenden on the district road 1853 via Schelmenholz, Hanweiler and the Hanweiler saddle to Korb,
- from Korb on the district road 1912 to Kleinheppach - Großheppach and further on the district road 1855 to Grunbach - Geradstetten to Hebsack; from Hebsack to Winterbach; via the country road 1150 and district road 1865 to Manolzweiler - Schnait, on the 1862, 1866 and 1861 to Endersbach;
- from Endersbach on the state road 1201 to Strümpfelbach - Schanbach - Aichschieß;
- from Aichschieß via the district roads 1267, 1213 and 1214 and the state road 1199 to Stetten im Remstal;
- from Stetten via the district road 1857 to Rommelshausen and via the state road 1198 to Fellbach,
- in Fellbach on the state road 1197 to the Bundesstraße 14 direction Stuttgart-Bad Cannstatt; via Landesstraße 1910 Neugereut and Hofen, then Hofener Straße, Teinacher Straße/Sulzerrainstraße, Schmidener Straße/Überlinger Straße, Wilhelmsbrücke, Brückenstraße, Altenburger Steige, Hallschlag, Auerbachstraße, Pragsattel, Killesberg, Birkenwaldstraße, Stuttgart city centre and via Neckarstraße and Mercedesstraße further to
- Stuttgart-Untertürkheim - Stuttgart-Rotenberg (Stuttgart) - Stuttgart-Uhlbach - Stuttgart-Obertürkheim;
- from Stuttgart-Obertürkheim on the district road 1270 to Mettingen to Esslingen am Neckar;
- from Esslingen on the state road 1192 to Plochingen and via Bundesstraße 313 to Nürtingen;
- from Nürtingen on the state road 1250 via Frickenhausen to Frickenhausen-Linsenhofen and from there the district road 1261 to Beuren;
- from Beuren via the state road 1210 to Neuffen - Kohlberg - Metzingen;

Destination: Kressbronn on Lake Constance - end of the Württemberg Wine Route.

== Predecessor: the Swabian Wine Route ==
The Swabian Wine Route (dt. Schwäbische Weinstraße) was a holiday route in Baden-Württemberg. It led through many wine villages in wine-growing area Württemberg.

It was inaugurated on 14 September 1993. It was followed in 1996 by a 320-kilometre-long cycle path and a branched network of hiking trails with a total length of 420 kilometres.

On October 13, 2004, the Swabian Wine Route was replaced by the newly created Württemberg Wine Route with an extended route.

== See also ==
- Viniculture in Stuttgart
