= Endersbach station =

Railway station in Weinstadt, Germany

Endersbach
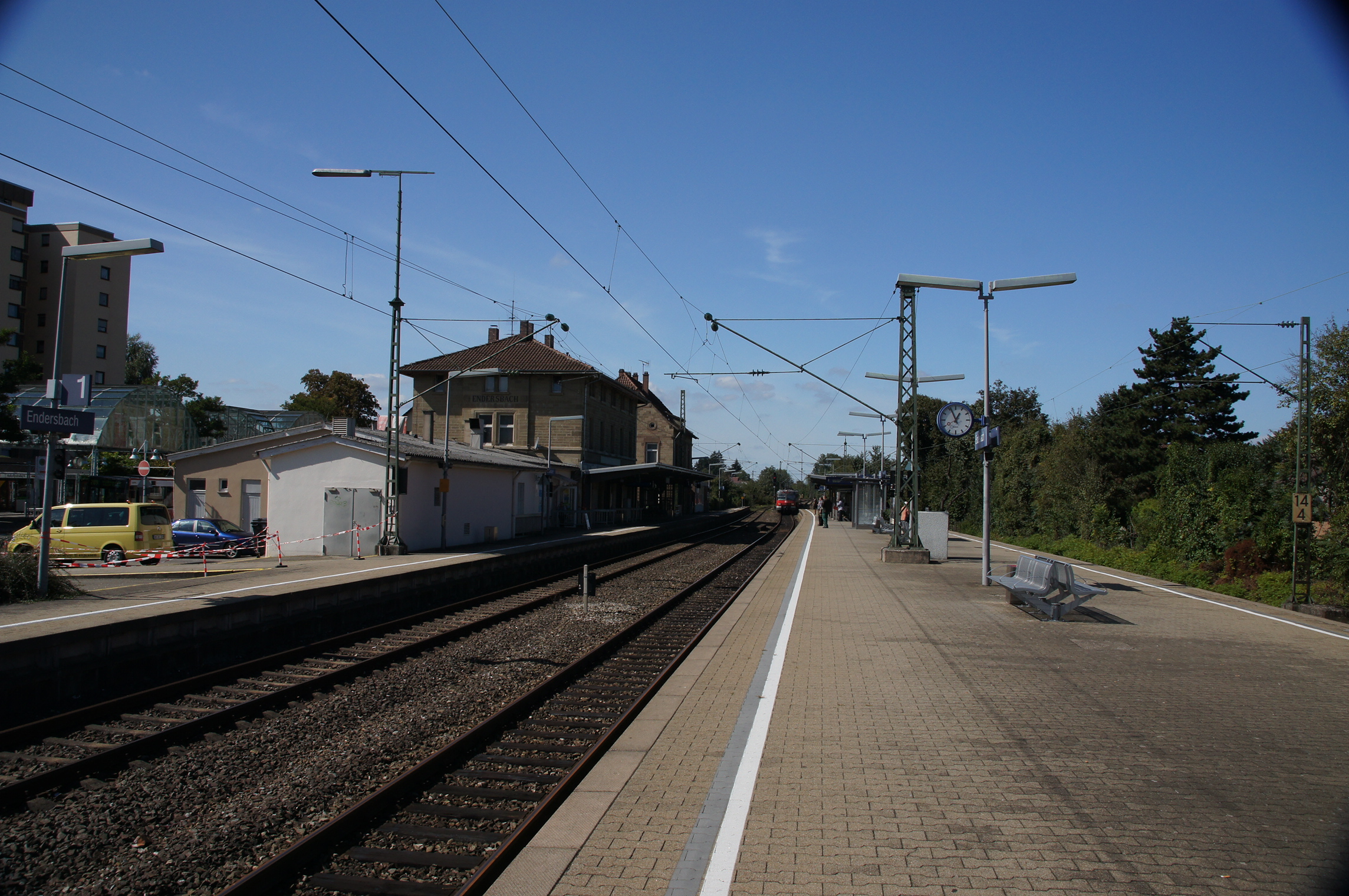

General information
- Location: Bahnhofstr. 21, Weinstadt, Baden-Württemberg; Germany
- Coordinates: 48°48′47″N 9°22′13″E
- Lines: Stuttgart–Nördlingen (KBS 786, KBS 790.2)
- Platforms: 3 (2 in normal operations)

Construction
- Accessible: Yes

Other information
- Station code: 5085
- DS100 code: TEN
- IBNR: 8001785
- Category: 4
- Fare zone: : 3
- Website: www.bahnhof.de

History
- Opened: 25 July 1861

Services
Preceding station	Stuttgart S-Bahn	Following station
Stetten-Beinstein towards Filderstadt	S2	Beutelsbach towards Schorndorf
Location

Endersbach station is located in the Endersbach district of the town of Weinstadt at the 14.4 kilometre point of the Stuttgart-Bad Cannstatt–Nördlingen railway in the German state of Baden-Württemberg and is a station on the Stuttgart S-Bahn network.

== History ==
The Royal Württemberg State Railways built some earthworks north of Endersbach for the establishment of the Rems Valley Railway (German: Remsthalbahn, old spelling) from Cannstatt to Wasseralfingen. It built a viaduct with four arches over the Haldenbach river and the road to Großheppach. It built Endersbach station a little to the east. The first trains ran over the new route on 25 July 1861, as planned.

The station building is still standing. It is a two-storey sandstone building with a high Kniestock ("knee jamb", which raises the base of a pitched roof to give more usable space) and a shallow hipped roof. On the ground floor there was a waiting room, a storage room, service room and a post office distribution centre, which was responsible until 1896 for Endersbach, Beutelsbach, Schnait and Aichelberg. The staff lived on the upper floors.

The municipality of Strümpfelbach, which was three kilometers away, tried on several occasions to persuade the State Railways to rename the station Endersbach-Strümpfelbach. But these requests were refused.

The anticipated speedy establishment of factories did not happen. Freight traffic consisted mainly of fruit—especially cherries—which was despatched by the farmers of Endersbach, Schnait, Strümpfelbach and Stetten towards Stuttgart; some went to Munich, which is about 200 km away.

In 1898, the post office moved into a new building to the west of the entrance building. Nevertheless, all space in the entrance building continued to be used. In the early 20th century the entrance building gained a one-storey extension on the eastern side to accommodate a larger waiting room.

On 26 October 1899, the State Railways opened a second mainline track between Waiblingen and Schorndorf.

On 11 November 1914, there was a train accident in Endersbach station. Because of a faulty setting of the points a freight train derailed, causing the locomotive and several carriages to overturn. The train driver and the fireman died. Other railway employees were injured, some seriously.

At the end of World War II, retreating Wehrmacht units blew up the Haldenbach viaduct. To quickly enable trains to run to Stuttgart again, American military engineers built a temporary bridge in August 1945.

Electrical services have operated on the Rems Railway between Waiblingen and Schorndorf since 27 May 1962. Stuttgart S-Bahn line 2, which serves Endersbach, started on 27 September 1981.

== Rail operations ==
Endersbach station is served by line S 2 of the Stuttgart S-Bahn. Platform track 1 (next to the station building) is used to allow overtaking as a result of disruptions to timetables and accidents. Track 2 is used by S-Bahn services towards Schorndorf. Track 3 is used by S-Bahn services towards Waiblingen. The station is classified by Deutsche Bahn as a category 4 station.

=== S-Bahn ===
Line	Route
S 2	Schorndorf – Endersbach – Waiblingen – Bad Cannstatt – Hauptbahnhof – Schwabstraße – Vaihingen – Rohr – Stuttgart Flughafen/Messe – Filderstadt (extra trains in the peak between Schorndorf and Vaihingen.)
