= Marco Fritz =

German football referee (born 1977)

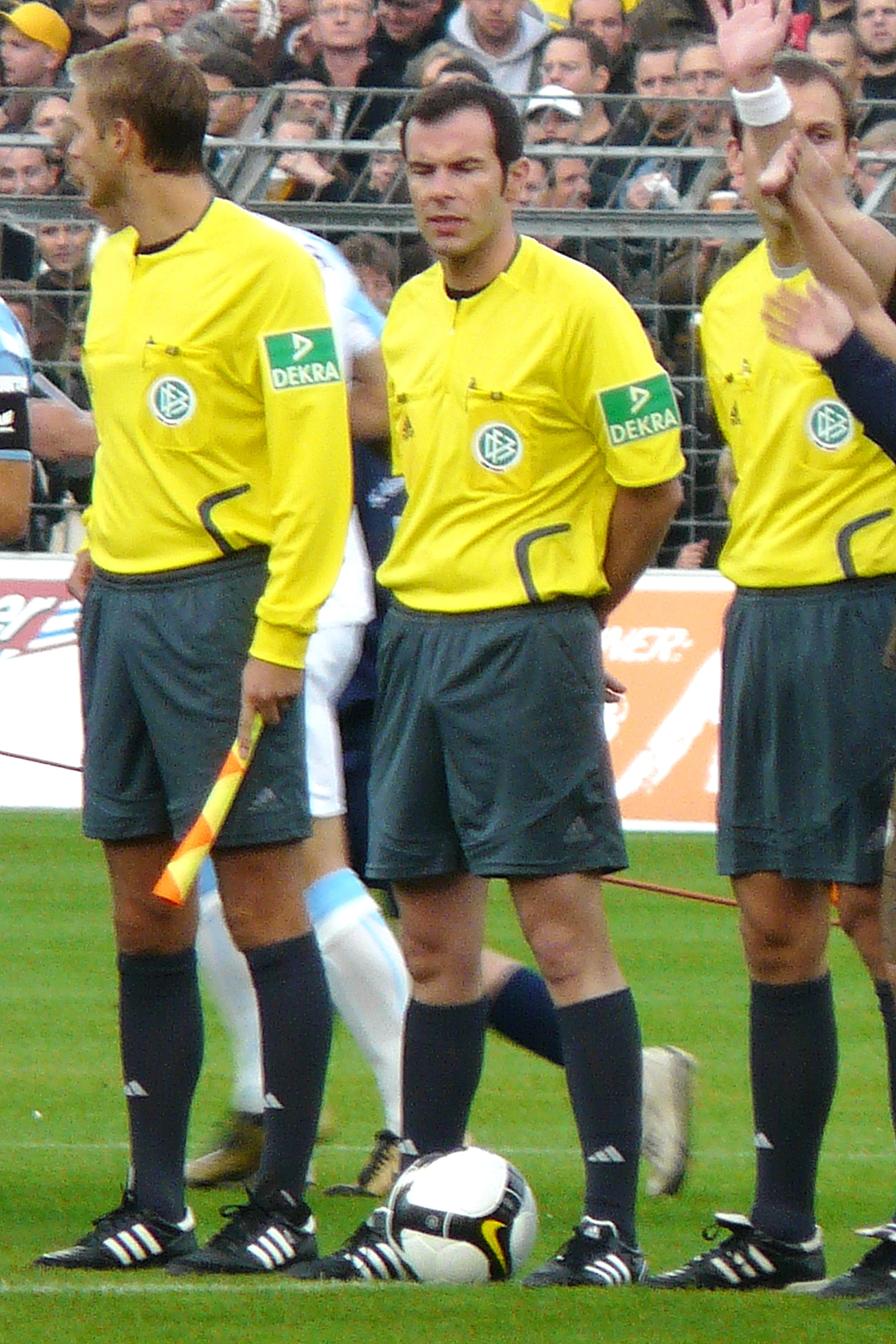
- Fritz (middle) in 2008
- Born: 3 October 1977 (age 49); Korb, West Germany
- Other occupation: Bank teller

Domestic
Years	League	Role
2006–2024	DFB	Referee
2008–2024	2. Bundesliga	Referee
2009–2024	Bundesliga	Referee

International
Years	League	Role
2012–2024	FIFA listed	Referee

Marco Fritz (born 3 October 1977) is a German retired football referee who is based in Korb. He referees for SV Breuningsweiler of the Württemberg Football Association. He is a FIFA referee, and is ranked as a UEFA second category referee.

== Refereeing career ==
At age six Fritz became a member of SV Breuningsweiler, for whom he has been a referee for since 1997. He officiated in the Landesverband Württemberg, and in 2006 he became a DFB referee. He first officiated in the 2. Bundesliga in the 2008–09 season. Throughout the season he awarded 34 yellow cards and one red card. Fritz was then promoted to officiate in the Bundesliga the following season. His first Bundesliga match was between SC Freiburg and Bayer Leverkusen.

In 2012 Fritz was put on the FIFA referees list along with Felix Zwayer. Babak Rafati and Peter Sippel were in turn taken off the list. His first international tournament was the 2012 UEFA European Under-19 Championship elite qualification. His international officiating debut was on 23 May 2012 in the match between Greece and Turkey.

Together with his assistants Dominik Schaal and Marcel Pelgrim, Fritz was chosen as the referee for the 2016 DFB-Pokal Final, which took place on 21 May 2016 in the Olympiastadion in Berlin between Bayern Munich and Borussia Dortmund. He retired in the summer of 2024.

== Personal life ==
Fritz is a banker and lives in Korb. His hobbies include sports and music.

== See also ==
- List of football referees
