= Viticulture in Stuttgart =

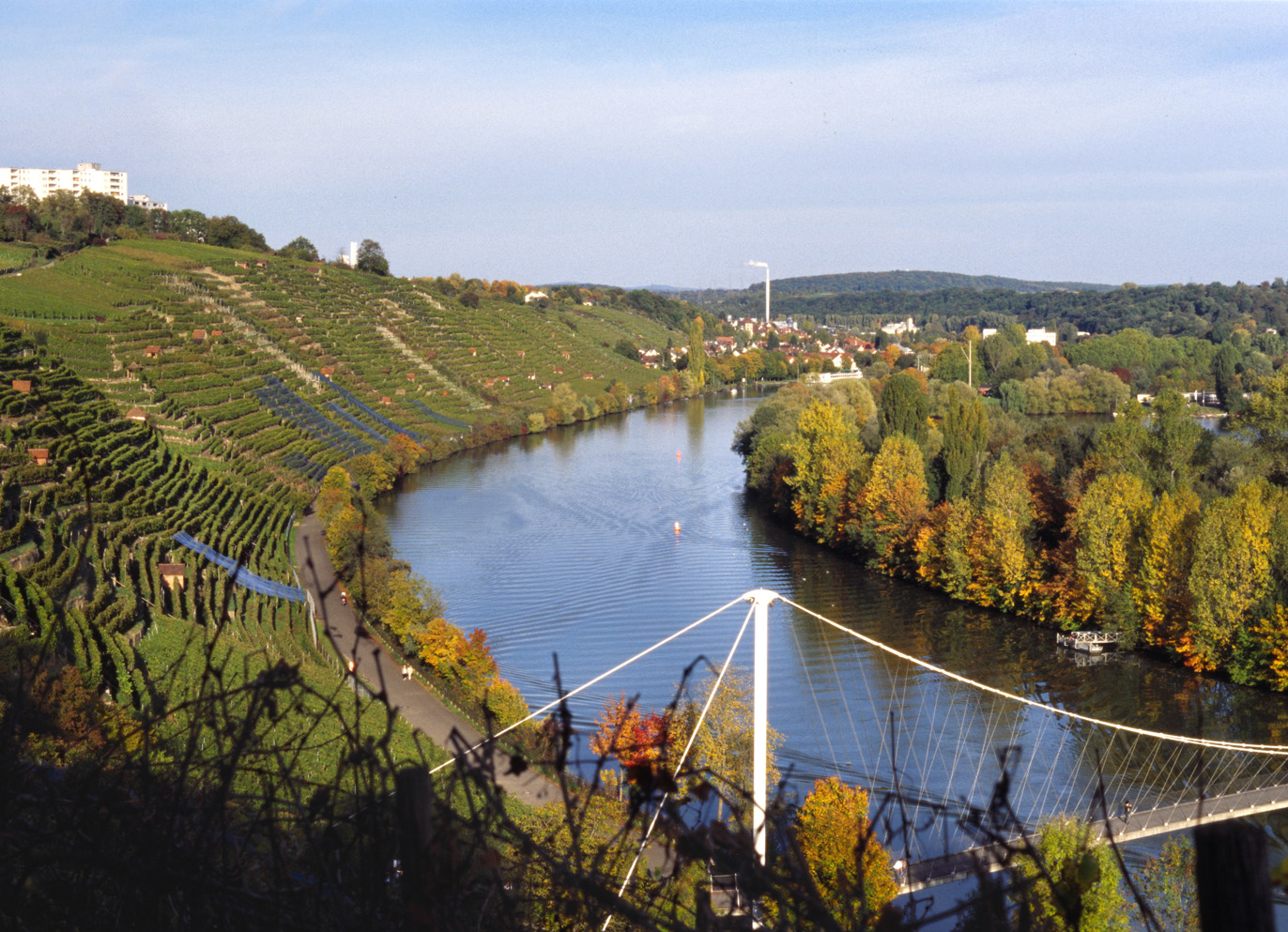
Steep slopes of the Zuckerle between Cannstatt and Mühlhausen

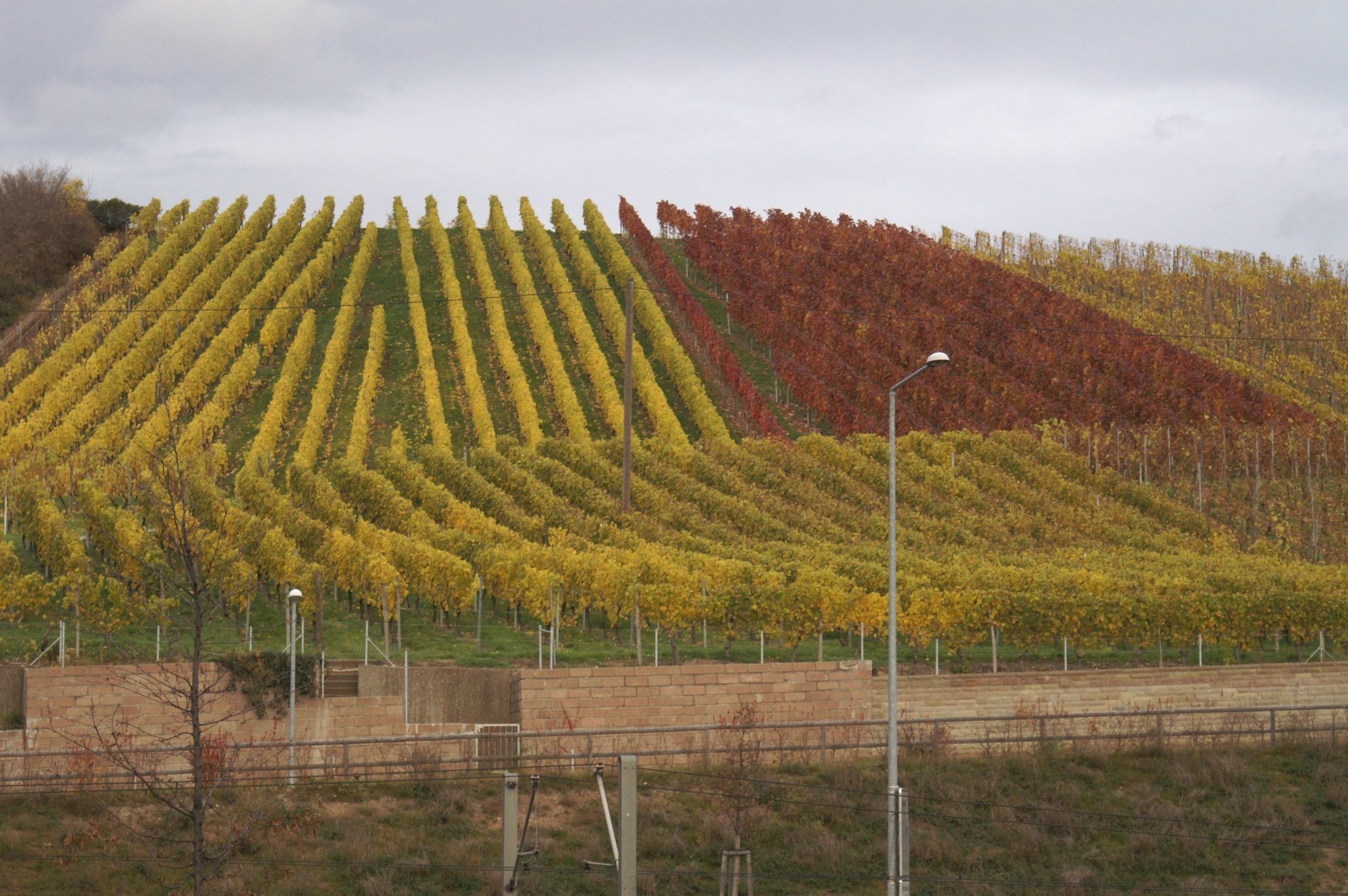
Vineyards on the Pragsattel

Viticulture in Stuttgart covers 423 hectares of vineyards - a good two percent of the city's area. The Baden-Württemberg state capital Stuttgart is located in the climatically favorable Neckar Valley and is one of Germany's largest wine-growing communities. Viticulture is practiced in 16 of the 23 city districts, and most of the approximately 500 businesses do so on a part-time basis. Agricultural businesses in the narrower sense cultivated 358 ha (as of 2007). The cultivated area is spread over 18 individual vineyards, all of which belong to the Weinsteige vineyard. Most of the land is cultivated on steep slopes. Red wine accounts for 71 percent of production (295 hectares of a total of 415 hectares of vineyards).

== Climate and geology ==
The entire Württemberg growing region lies in a transition zone between the Atlantic and continental climate. The Neckar Valley benefits from the moderating influence of the river. Due to its location in the rain shadow of the northern Black Forest, Stuttgart is one of the places in Germany with the highest solar radiation. With a growing season of 230–240 days (average temperature above 5 °C), Stuttgart has the longest growing season in all of Württemberg. The only disadvantage for viticulture is the high risk of hailstorms, against which one or two hail planes are used.

Geologically, Stuttgart's vineyards predominantly belong to the Keuper region. Shell limestone only dominates in the northeast of the city (Bad Cannstatt, Mühlhausen). Due to the steepness of the layers, the soil layer made up of the weathering products of the subsoil – marl and sandy to clayey loam – is quite thin. The vines therefore have to drive their roots into the parent rock.

== Grape varieties ==
Following the Württemberg tradition, red wine also dominates in Stuttgart. At the beginning of the 1990s, 62.5 percent of the 400 hectares were planted with red grape varieties. The Trollinger alone accounted for 190 hectares. The Pinot Noir took up 15 hectares. The Dornfelder is now becoming increasingly important. Also worth mentioning are Lemberger, Heroldrebe, Samtrot, Muskat-Trollinger and Sankt Laurent. More recently, Merlot and Cabernet Sauvignon have also been planted – a response to the growing demand for full-bodied red wines. The typically dry and sunny autumn weather allows these grape varieties, which come from wine-growing regions far further south, to still ripen. However, their quality potential is difficult to assess because these vineyards are still very young.

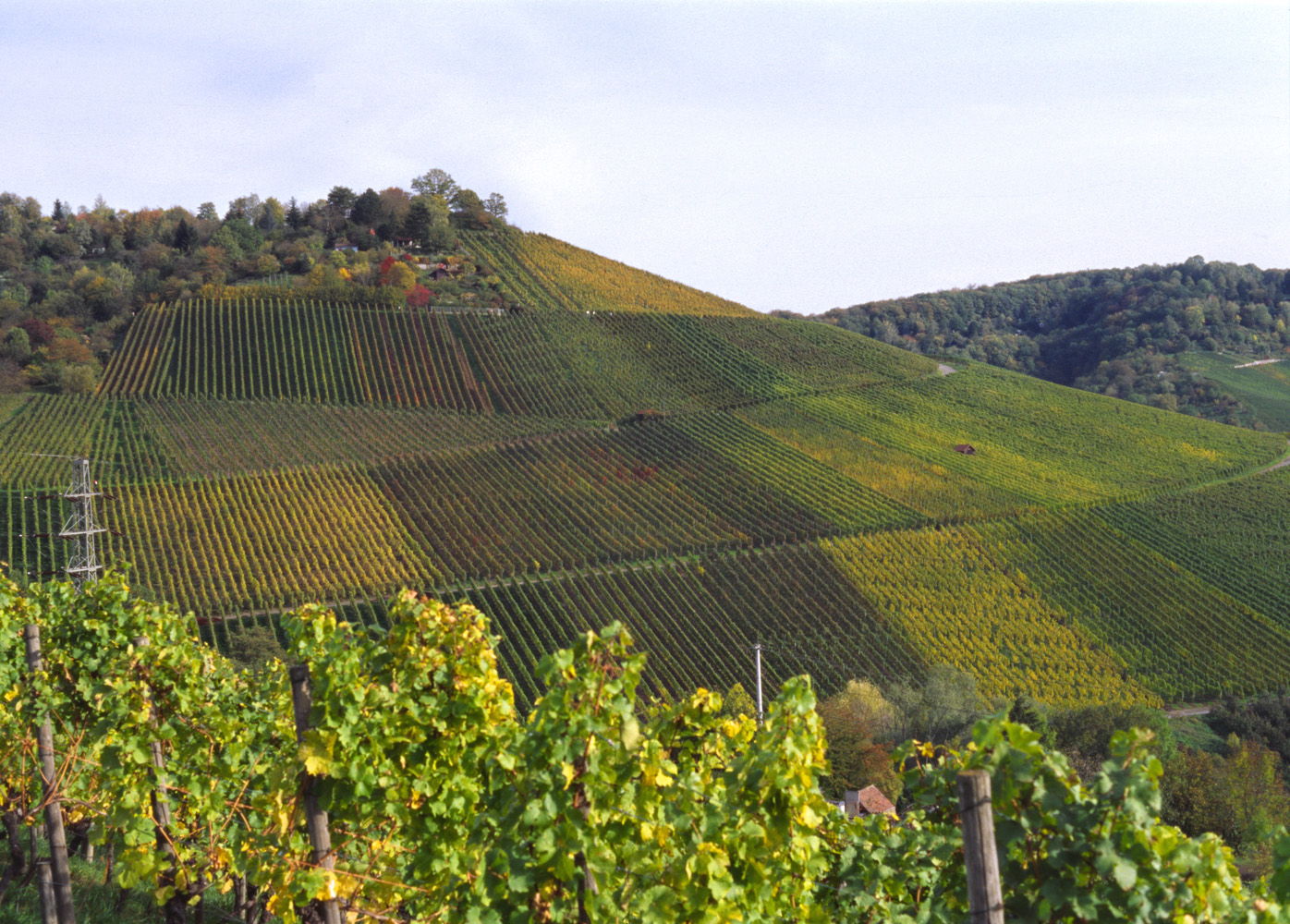
Reorganized Uhlbacher Götzenberg

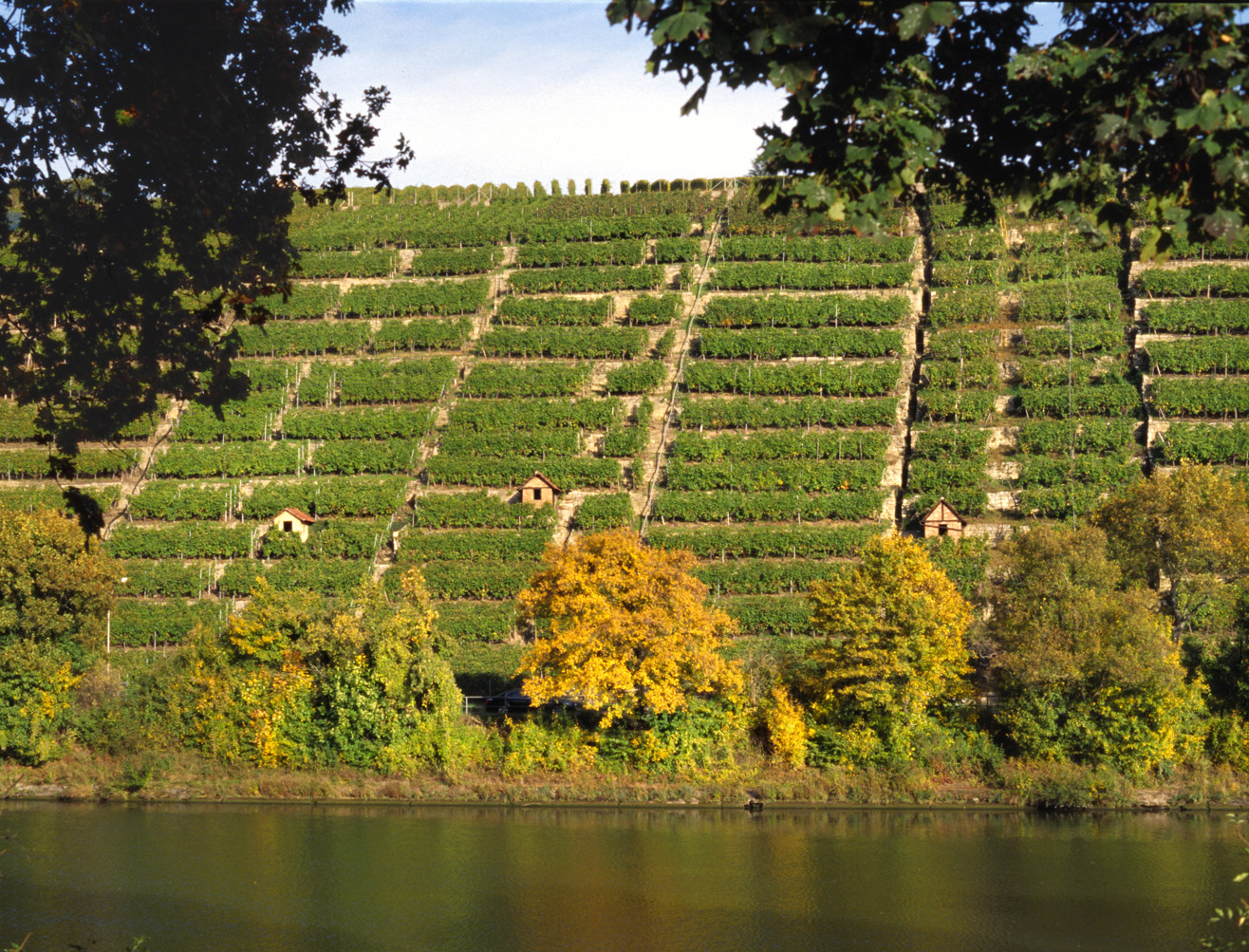
Wall terraces of the Cannstatter Zuckerle

In recent decades, white wine has regained ground – in 1950, over 90 percent were planted with red vines. Riesling is the leader among white grape varieties – it occupied 65 hectares in the early 1990s. Müller-Thurgau accounted for 40 hectares. Silvaner, Kerner, Pinot Blanc and Gewürztraminer are also cultivated on a larger scale. Recently, Chardonnay and Sauvignon Blanc have also been gaining ground.

== Vineyards ==
The Stuttgart vineyard sites, together with those in the city of Esslingen am Neckar and parts of the Fellbach vineyards, form the large “Weinsteige” site. However, the latter is rarely found on labels, as Stuttgart wines usually only come from a single vineyard anyway. The Stuttgart district is noted before the location name, e.g. B. “Cannstatter Zuckerle” or “Untertürkheimer Altenberg”. Only the wines grown in the inner city districts can be called “Stuttgart”.

Stuttgart vineyards (clockwise from the city center)
Location name	Neighborhoods	Area (ha)	Orientation	Steepness	Soil type
Mönchhalde	Stuttgart, Bad Cannstatt	5	West – southeast – east (small isolated layers)	steep	Keuper weathering clayey loam – loamy clay
Kriegsberg	Stuttgart	1.5	South – southeast	steep	Keuper weathering loamy clay
Berg	Stuttgart, Wangen, Münster, Bad Cannstatt, Feuerbach, Zuffenhausen	90	Southwest – south – southeast	moderately to steep	Keuper weathering clayey loam, loamy clay
Halde	Bad Cannstatt	3.5	southwest	steep to steeply inclined	Muschelkalk weathering clayey loam
Zuckerle	Bad Cannstatt, Münster, Hofen, Mühlhausen	20	West – South – Southeast	steep wall terraces	Muschelkalk weathering clayey loam, loamy clay
Steinhalde	Bad Cannstatt, Münster, Mühlhausen	20	Southwest – South – East	predominantly steep (terraced)	Muschelkalk weathering clayey loam, loamy clay
Mönchberg	Untertürkheim, Fellbach	50	West – South – Southeast	slightly inclined to steep	Keuper weathering light marl – sandy loam, loamy clay
Herzogenberg	Bad Cannstatt, Untertürkheim	15	West – southwest – south	slightly to strongly inclined	Keuper weathering clayey loam
Gips	Untertürkheim, Fellbach	10	Southwest – South	moderately inclined	Gypsum Keuper weathering clayey loam – loamy clay
Altenberg	Untertürkheim	23	Southwest – South	steep	Keuper weathering light marl – loamy sand – loamy clay
Schlossberg	Rotenberg, Uhlbach, Untertürkheim	40	Southwest – south – southeast	slightly inclined to steep	Keuper weathering marly to sandy loam
Götzenberg mit Steingrube	Uhlbach	70	West – South	steep	Keuper weathering sandy to clayey loam
Kirchberg	Obertürkheim	22	West – Southwest – Southeast	steep	Keuper weathering light marl gravel to clayey loam
Ailenberg	Obertürkheim, Esslingen	28	West – Southwest	steep	Keuper weathering light marl gravel to clayey loam
Lenzenberg	Hedelfingen, Rohracker	27	Southwest – South	steeply inclined, partly steep terraces	Keuper weathering clayey loam, heavy clay
Schlossberg	Hohenheim	3.7	South	moderately inclined	Clay on Black Jura
Schnarrenberg	Bad Cannstatt	3.5	Southwest	steep (terraced)	Keuper weathering clayey loam, loamy clay
Abelsberg	Stuttgart, Gablenberg, Gaisburg	3	West – Southeast (small isolated layers)	moderately to strongly inclined	Keuper weathering clayey loam, loamy clay

== Producer ==
=== Cooperatives ===
Cooperatives	Foundation	Members	Vineyard area (ha)
Bad Cannstatt	1923	70	45
Hedelfingen	1955	40	11,5
Rotenberg-Uhlbach	1936/1906	214	120
Rohracker	1919	37	8
Untertürkheim	1887	91	95

The majority of Stuttgart wines are produced by the five wine cooperatives. Their members include many part-time winegrowers. Production is mainly for the local market, which is why the traditional Trollinger predominates. However, the larger cooperatives have responded to a shift in demand with new product lines. International grape varieties, yield restrictions and modern cellaring processes including barrel aging are now part of the repertoire. At the forefront of this movement is the Untertürkheim wine manufacturer, a cooperative that has called itself a wine manufacturer since 2001. Its cellar master Jürgen Off was voted “Estate Manager of the Year” in 2005 by Gault Millau. By being awarded the third grape in the 2009 Gault Millau, the Untertürkheim wine manufacturer has managed to rise to the upper house of Württemberg. This success also convinced the neighbors: in 2004, the Obertürkheim cooperatives voted unanimously to join the wine manufacturer. In 2007, the Uhlbach and Rotenberg winegrowers' cooperatives merged to form Collegium Wirtemberg - Weingärtner Rotenberg & Uhlbach e. G. Their wines are produced in the "Fleckensteinbruch" wine press on the outskirts of Untertürkheim. The Hedelfingen winegrowers' cooperative is one of the smallest cooperatives in the greater Stuttgart area in terms of its cooperative structure.

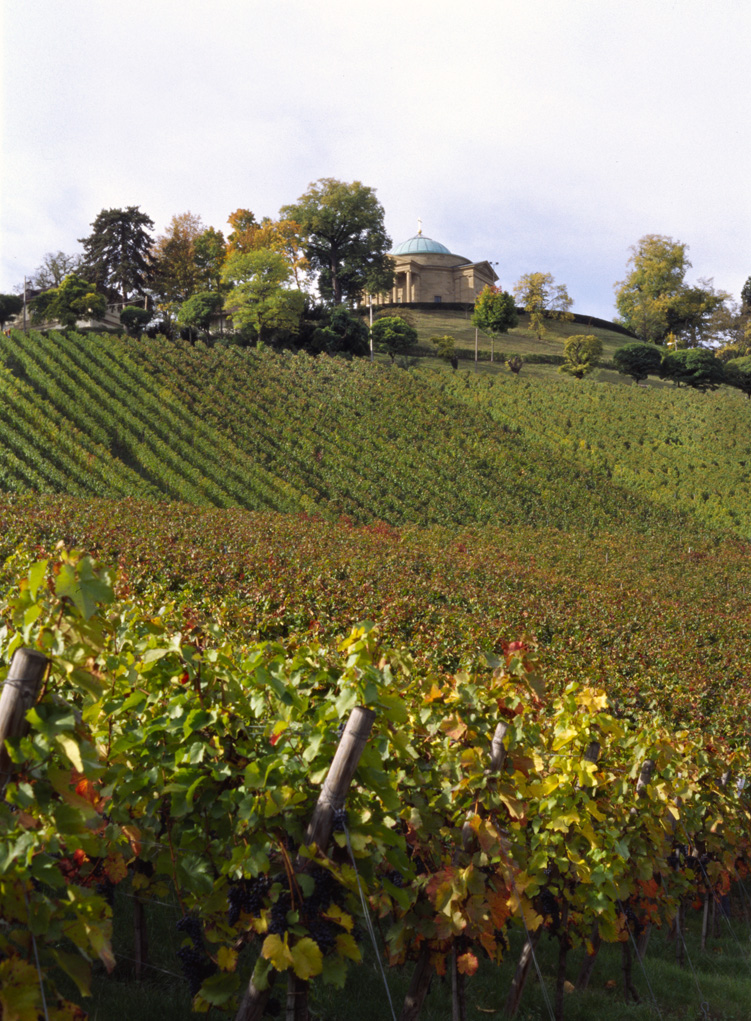
Untertürkheimer Altenberg at the foot of the Württemberg

=== Private wineries ===
Most of the private Stuttgart wineries only produce small quantities, which are served either in the attached wine taverns or in local wine bars. Only a few are known beyond the region. Four estates with Stuttgart locations are members of the Association of German Prädikat Wine Estates (VDP):

- The Heid winery is located in Fellbach and cultivates, among other things, Pinot Noir & Lemberger in the large "Lämmler" vineyard. A large part of the 11 hectares of vineyards are Trollinger, Pinot Noir, Lemberger & Riesling. A small specialty of the winery is the "Endersbacher Wetzstein - Pinot Noir Auslese". The winery has been a member of the VDP since 2013 and has been certified organic since 2007.
- The Aldinger winery, based in Fellbach, cultivates a total of 23 hectares, including the Untertürkheimer Gips (9.6 hectares) as a monopoly site. 24% is Riesling, 19% Trollinger, 12% each Red Burgundy and Lemberger, and the rest Sauvignon Blanc, Pinot Blanc, Cabernet grape varieties and Merlot.
- The Untertürkheimer Herzogenberg (15 hectares) is the sole property of the Untertürkheimer Wöhrwag winery. A total of 18.5 hectares are planted with 35 percent Riesling, 20 percent Trollinger and 10 percent each Lemberger and Merlot, the rest being Pinot Gris and Pinot Blanc, Sauvignon Blanc, Muscat, Pinot Noir and Cabernet Sauvignon.
- The Herzog von Württemberg winery in Ludwigsburg, which belongs to the court chamber of the House of Württemberg, owns 7.5 hectares in the Untertürkheimer Mönchberg on the Württemberg. The wines offered are Lemberger and Spätburgunder.
- The Fellbach winery Rainer Schnaitmann cultivates not only Fellbach vineyards, but also smaller areas in Uhlbach's Götzenberg and Untertürkheim's Altenberg. The former even produces a Grosses Gewächs.

Other quality-oriented estates are:

- Weingut Diehl (5.4 ha), Rotenberg (Schlossberg)
- Weingut Warth (10 ha) Rotenberg (Altenberg und Mönchberg)
- Weingut Markus Schwarz (8.6 ha), Untertürkheim (Altenberg and Mönchberg)
- Wein- und Sektgut Christel Currle (8.5 ha), Uhlbach (Götzenberg)
- Weingut Gerhard Schwarz (2.5 ha), Untertürkheim (Altenberg und Mönchberg)
- Weingut Peter Mayer Jägerhof (3.3 ha), Burgholzhof (Cannstatter Berg)
- Weingut Albert und Konrad Zaiß (11 ha), Obertürkheim (Kirchberg)
- Weingut Bauer (4 ha), Bad Cannstatt (locations: Cannstatter Berg and Zuckerle, Feuerbacher Berg)

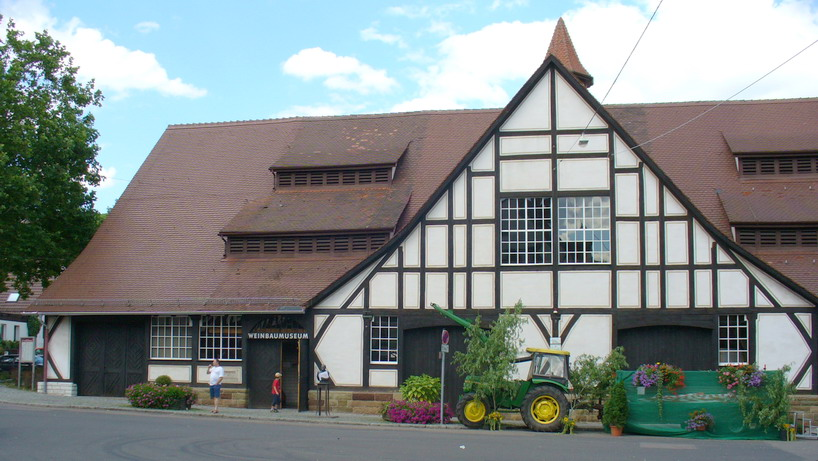
Uhlbach Wine Museum

=== Municipal Winery ===
The city of Stuttgart’s winery has been in existence since 1949. Before that, the yield from the city’s vineyards was auctioned off. The winery is located in a former air raid shelter in Bad Cannstatt. The estate cultivates 17.4 hectares in the Stuttgart Mönchhalde (including on the Karlshöhe and the Neue Weinsteige), the Cannstatter Berg and the Cannstatter Zuckerle. By maintaining a total of 4.9 hectares of terraced steep slopes, the city is doing its part to preserve these cultural monuments. The quality of the wines has improved considerably in recent years. In 2007, the sale of 124,000 litres of wine generated sales of 700,000 euros, meaning the winery is in the red. As a way out, an expert commissioned by the city suggested privatizing or leasing the estate. A market survey is now being carried out to examine the alternatives of leasing or continuing to operate it as a municipally owned business. A decision should be made by the end of 2008. In April 2009, the city's Committee for Economic Affairs and Housing approved the renovation of the city's wine press after the building was only partially usable due to structural defects. In addition to the winery, the city also operates the Stuttgart Wine Museum in the former Uhlbach wine press.

== History ==
The roots of winegrowing in the middle Neckar may go back to Roman times. The first documented mention dates back to 708 and documents vineyard ownership by the monastery of St. Gallen in Cannstatt. In the 10th century, cultivation on wall terraces was introduced in the Neckar valley. It is highly likely that wine has been grown in the inner city area since the 11th century, as a document from 1108 mentions the donation of a Stuttgart vineyard to the Blaubeuren monastery.

The oldest vineyard in Stuttgart could be the Relenberg, located near the Old Castle, whose name goes back to the Duchess Regelinda, wife of Duke Hermann I of Swabia. The Mönchhalde and Kriegsberg were first mentioned in documents in 1229 and 1259, among others. Records of the quality of the harvests have been preserved since the 13th century. In 1400, a winegrowers' ordinance was issued to put a stop to wine counterfeiting. The Stuttgart winegrowers' guild was founded in the early 16th century. In order to prevent frequent disputes over wine prices, it was decreed in 1456 that a "wine account" should be drawn up after the harvest. A commission was set up for this purpose, consisting of two councilors, a sub-buyer (wine broker) and four winegrowers. These "seven" made a price proposal for the wine trade. Despite the regulations, prices fluctuated greatly. The price of a bucket (293.92 l) in the 16th century was between two and ten guilders. Poor harvests between 1585 and 1589 drove it up to 36 guilders.

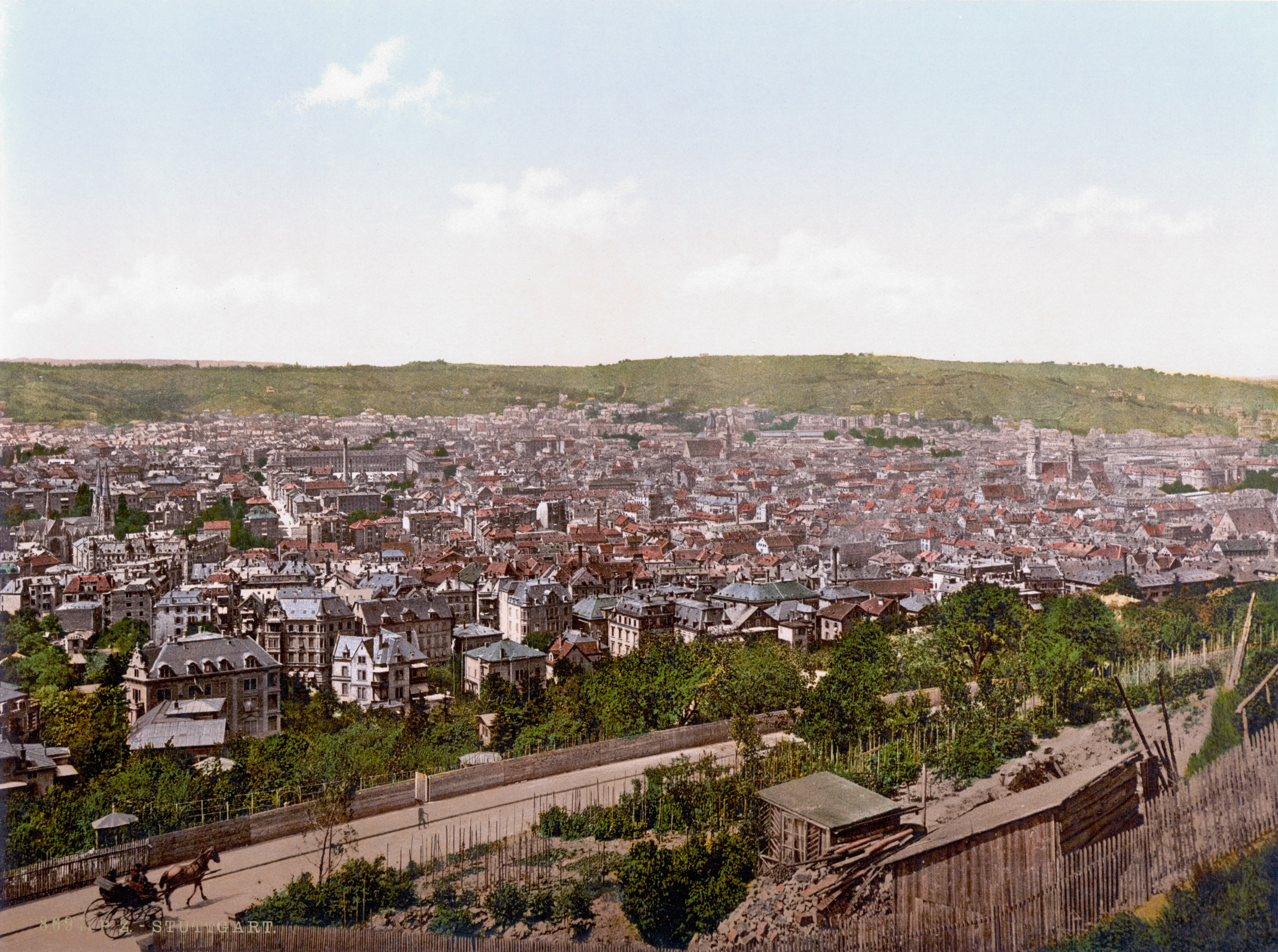
View from the south over Stuttgart at the end of the 19th century. The northern edge of the valley basin in the background is still recognizably shaped by.

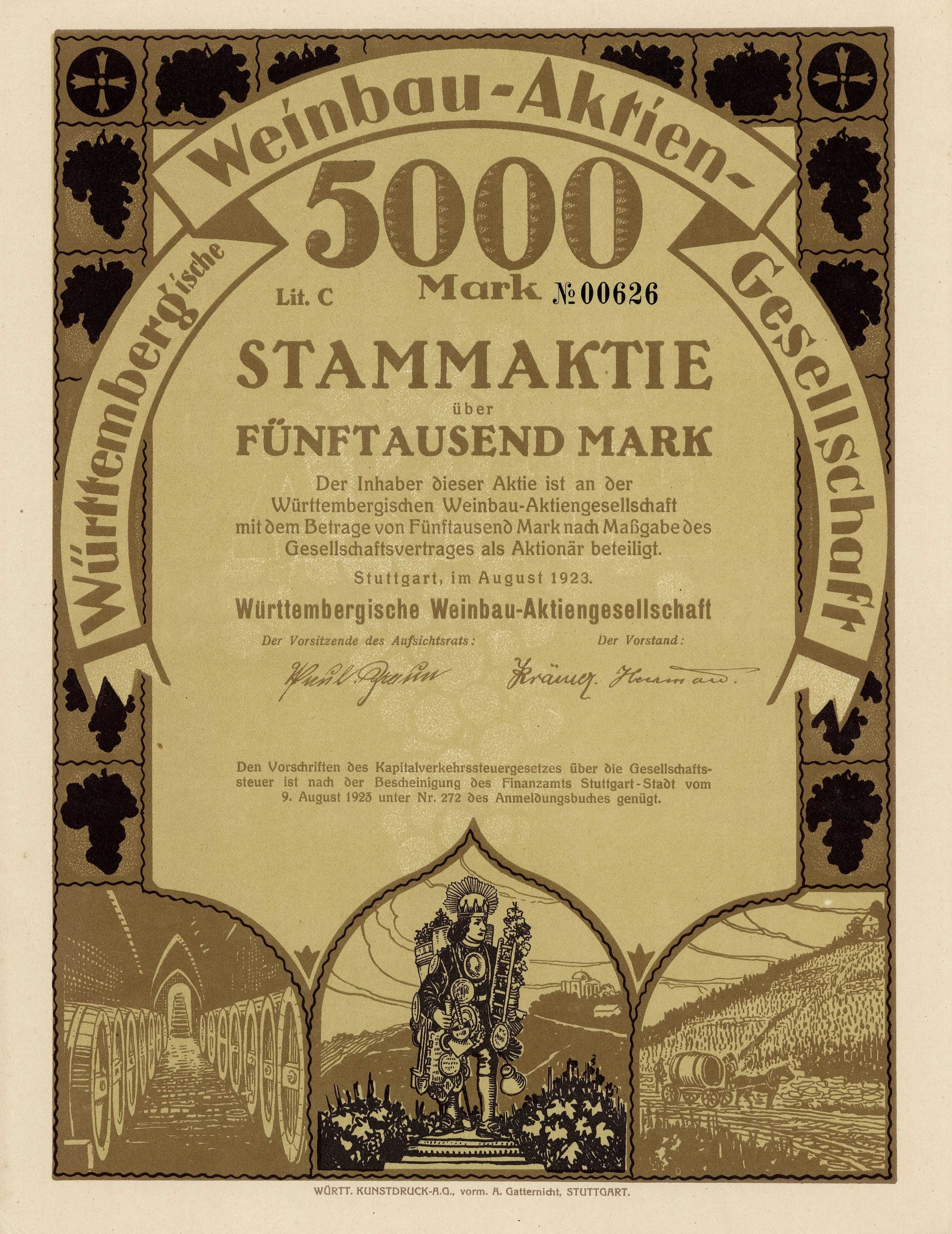
Share of Württembergische Weinbau-AG from Stuttgart dated August 1923

Winegrowing remained the main source of income for the people of Stuttgart throughout the Middle Ages. By 1350, 502 hectares were already planted, and by 1594, over 1200 hectares - not including the suburbs that were later incorporated, such as Cannstatt and Untertürkheim! After Vienna and Würzburg, Stuttgart was Germany's largest wine-growing community in the 16th century. Most of Stuttgart's wine was exported eastwards via Ulm. However, this agrarian economic structure of their residential city bothered the rulers of Württemberg. In the middle of the 16th century, Duke Christoph of Württemberg even banned the planting of new vineyards under threat of punishment, except in what had previously been "uncultivated wilderness".

However, after the destruction of the Thirty Years' War - a quarter of the vineyard area lay fallow in 1648 - the pendulum swung back: to protect Stuttgart's wine-growing industry, the import of foreign wine was banned in 1655, and beer brewing was also prohibited in 1667. In 1710, this ban was extended to the whole of Württemberg. Quality assurance measures also date back to the early modern period: the first autumn regulations, issued in 1595, regulated, among other things, the start of the harvest, the so-called autumn set, and the operation of the wine presses. Another autumn order in 1607 recommended that winegrowers grow quality varieties. At that time, these were Klevner, Silvaner, Grüner Veltliner, Gutedel, Gewürztraminer and Muscat. By the middle of the 18th century, white grape varieties predominated, accounting for around 80%.

Feudal structures dominated winegrowing until the 18th century. It was not until 1813 that the so-called wine press ban was lifted, which only allowed noble and ecclesiastical landowners to operate wine presses. This meant that the amount of tithe wine could be precisely controlled. The wine presses became municipal property, but from then on were only allowed to be operated outside the city walls. The importance of wine growing for Stuttgart only declined with industrialization and the resulting displacement of the vineyards.

In the first half of the 19th century, 400 wine-growing families cultivated just under a third of the Old Stuttgart area, but by 1895 this had fallen to just 15 percent - 400 hectares. Stuttgart's vineyard area grew again to 750 hectares through incorporations, but more and more vineyards fell victim to the growth of the city. In the middle of the 19th century, only six wine presses were still in operation in Old Stuttgart, but by the beginning of the 18th century, there were 27. Today, all that remains of these is the "Fruchtkasten" on Schillerplatz, which is used as a museum for old musical instruments.

Decline in Stuttgart’s wine-growing area
District	Vineyard area (ha)	
District	1850	2006
Alt-Stuttgart	750	10
Degerloch	23	3.5
Feuerbach	140	15
Hedelfingen	92	16
Rohracker	66	12
Wangen	112	2
Zuffenhausen	50	10

The last significant change was the consolidation of vineyards in the 1960s. The dry stone walls in Ober- and Untertürkheim, Hedelfingen, Rotenberg and Uhlbach gave way to wide terraces that are accessible via asphalted farm roads. 110 hectares still retain their original shape today. The vineyards on the Neue Weinsteige, which were threatened with decay, were restored by 1990 and replanted by the municipal winery.

The republican minority among the winegrowers founded the “Winzerklubb” in 1863, and it was not until 1904 that all the winegrowers joined together in the “Stuttgarter Winzerbund”. The first winegrowers’ cooperative was founded in Untertürkheim in 1887. However, it was re-established every autumn and only became a permanent organization in 1907. Other cooperatives were founded in Obertürkheim in 1918, Cannstatt in 1923 and Rotenberg in 1936. After the Second World War, 45 cooperatives joined together to form the State Central Cooperative of Württemberg Winegrowers' Cooperatives, based in Untertürkheim. It is now called the Württemberg Winegrowers' Central Cooperative and moved its headquarters to Möglingen in 1968. Even though winegrowing no longer plays a significant role in Stuttgart's economy, the "Wingerts" still have political influence: two of the 60 Stuttgart municipal councilors are full-time winegrowers.

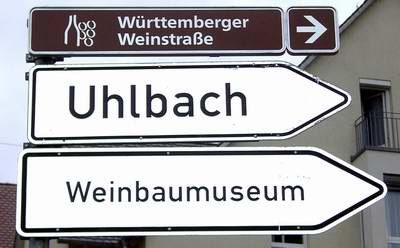
Württemberger Weinstraße

== Wine culture ==
Numerous events show Stuttgart's connection with its wine-growing. The biggest event is the Stuttgart Wine Village, which has been held in the city center from late August to early September since 1974. Stuttgart and other Württemberg wines are served to visitors at 120 stands. There are offshoots of this in Hamburg and Berlin. The Swabian "Vierteles-Schlotzer" can keep to themselves at the wine-press festivals in the districts and the numerous wine taverns and wine bars.

The Württemberg Wine Route runs through Stuttgart, and since April 12, 2007, it has made a detour from Stuttgart-Münster to the city center and from there on to Bad Cannstatt. The history of Stuttgart's wine-growing is presented in the Uhlbach Wine Museum. The Tourist Office has marked out four wine hiking trails.
