= Beutelsbach consensus =

Educational philosophy

The Beutelsbach consensus constitutes a minimum standard for civic (Politische Bildung) and religious education (Religionsunterricht) in Germany. It was developed in the frame of a 1976 conference held in the southern German town of Beutelsbach to reanimate the exchange of different didactic schools after a period of deep conflicts. The Beutelsbach Consensus remains of high importance today.

== Main pillars ==
=== Prohibition against overwhelming the pupil ===
It is not permissible to catch pupils unprepared or unaware - by whatever means - for the sake of imparting desirable opinions and to hinder them from `forming an independent judgment’. It is precisely at this point that the dividing line runs between political education and indoctrination. Indoctrination is incompatible with the role of a teacher in a democratic society and the universally accepted objective of making pupils capable of independent judgment (Mündigkeit).

=== Treating controversial subjects as controversial ===
Matters which are controversial in intellectual and political affairs must also be taught as controversial in educational instruction. This demand is very closely linked with the first point above, for if differing points of view are lost sight of, options suppressed, and alternatives remain undiscussed, then the path to indoctrination is being trodden. We have to ask whether teachers have in fact a corrective role to play. That is, whether they should or should not specially set out such points of view and alternatives which are foreign to the social and political origins of pupils (and other participants in programs of political education). In affirming this second basic principle, it becomes clear why the personal standpoint of teachers, the intellectual and theoretical views they represent and their political opinions are relatively uninteresting. To repeat an example that has already been given: their understanding of democracy presents no problems, for opinions contrary to theirs are also being taken into account.

=== Giving weight to the personal interests of pupils ===
Pupils must be put in a position to analyse a political situation and to assess how their own personal interests are affected as well as to seek means and ways to influence the political situation they have identified according to their personal interests. Such an objective brings a strong emphasis on the acquisition of the necessary operational skills, which is in turn a logical consequence of the first two principles set out above. In this connection the reproach is sometimes made that this is a `return to formalism’, so that teachers do not have to correct the content of their own beliefs. This is not the case since what is involved here is not a search for a maximum consensus, but the search for a minimal consensus.

== Comparison with other jurisdictions ==
By its nature, the Beutelsbach Consensus is very much soft law, or an informal convention and self-commitment. It is mainly enforced by funders imposing adherence to the Beutelsbach Consensus as a requirement.

This is different from the situation in England and Wales where sections 406 and 407 of the Education Act 1994 explicitly require a local authority to forbid political indoctrination and to secure a balanced presentation of opposing views.
