= Beutelsbach (Weinstadt) =

- Stadtteil of Weinstadt
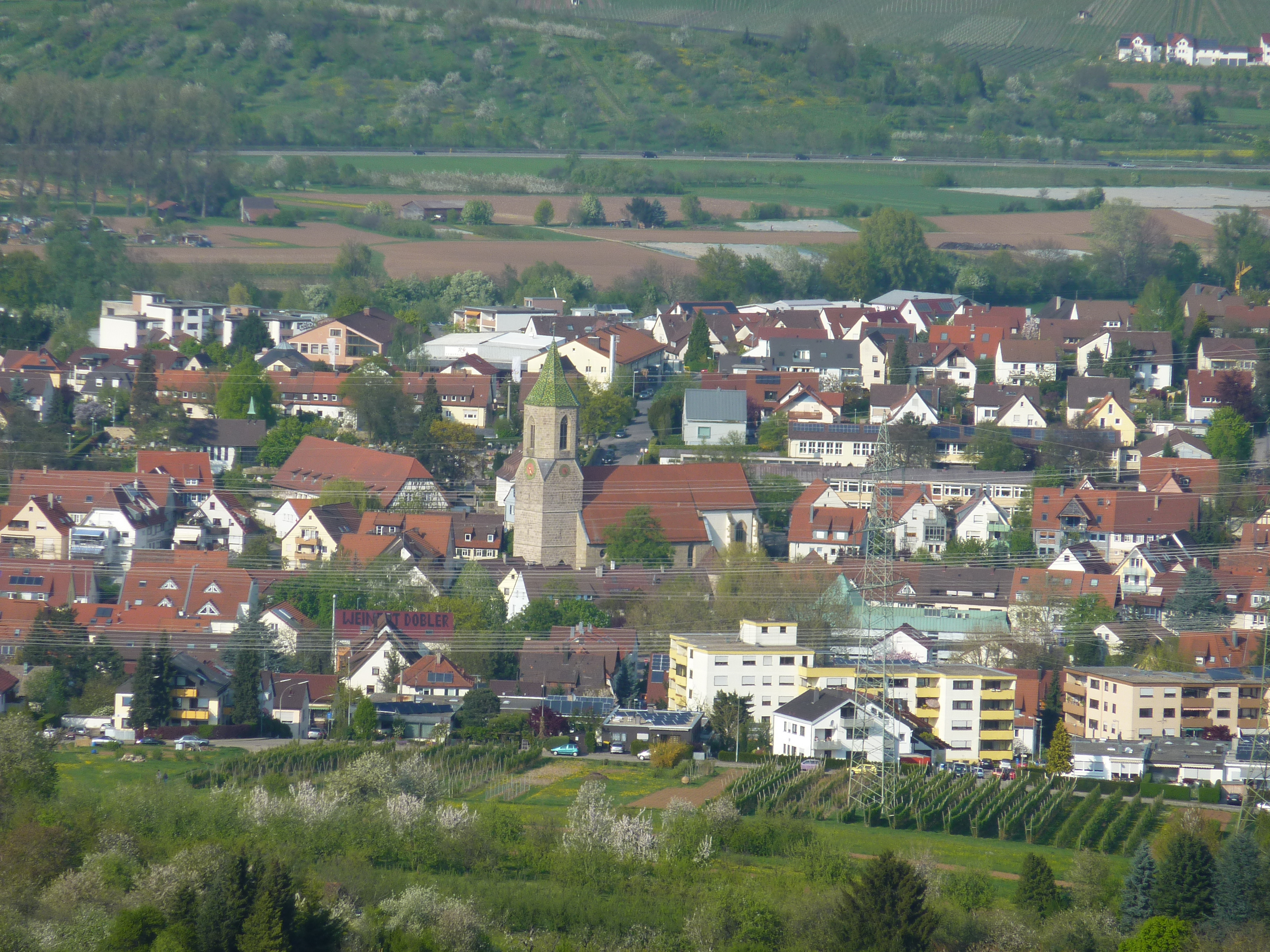

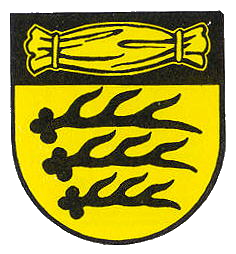
- Coat of arms
- Interactive map of Beutelsbach
- Location within Germany Location within Baden-Württemberg
- Coordinates: 48°48′N 09°23′E
- Country: Germany
- State: Baden-Württemberg
- District: Rems-Murr
- Town: Weinstadt
- Elevation: 239 m (784 ft)

Population (2014)
  - Total: 8,622
- Time zone: UTC+01:00 (CET)
  - Summer (DST): UTC+02:00 (CEST)
- Postal codes: 71384
- Dialling codes: 07151

Beutelsbach is a town district or Stadtteil within the town of Weinstadt ("Wine City") in Rems-Murr district, Baden-Württemberg, Germany. The Stadtteil has a population of 8,464 (as of March 31, 2010) and an elevation of 236 m above sea level.

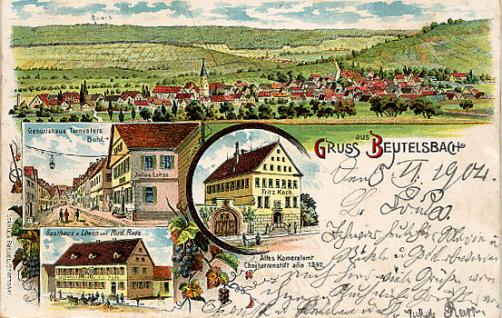
Beutelsbach in 1904

== History ==
Beutelsbach was first mentioned in 1080 and was one of the oldest properties of the House of Württemberg. The first known ancestor of the Württemberg family was Konrad von Württemberg, whose nephew Konrad (son of Luitgard von Beutelsbach) further established the family. The Beutelsbach Stift (or college) was probably founded in the 11th century and then later expanded by Count Ulrich I. of Württemberg. The collegiate church in Beutelsbach was the burial site of the House of Württemberg from that point until the Stift was destroyed in 1311 and moved to Stuttgart.

The Poor Conrad peasant rebellion began in Beutelsbach in May 1514. Since 1989, an exhibit on peasant revolts in the former town hall has memorialized the peasant uprisings in 1514 and 1525.

In 1968, the remains of Burg Beutelsbach (Beutelsbach Castle) were discovered on Kappelberg, a hill above the town.

From 1958 through 1976, Stanford University in California, United States, maintained an "overseas campus" for Stanford undergraduates in Beutelsbach. The hilltop campus is now the Landgut Burg hotel and conference center.

The basic principles of the political education for Baden-Württemberg were established in Beutelsbach in 1976 as the Beutelsbacher Konsens ("Beutelsbach Consensus"). Today, they are still important elements in the political discourse.

== Governmental structure ==
The municipality of Beutelsbach included the village of Beutelsbach, the homestead Schönbühl, the estate Burg, and the settlement Benzach. It had an area of 7.69 km^{2}. It was known as Beutelsbach-bei-Stuttgart to distinguish it from Beutelsbach in Bavaria.

The town belonged to Amt/Oberamt Schorndorf (an administrative district within Württemberg). After the dissolution of Oberamt Schorndorf in 1938, Beutelsbach joined the Waiblingen Kreis (district). In 1973 Waiblingen was merged with other adjacent districts to form the Rems-Murr-Kreis, to which the area now belongs.

On January 1, 1975, the municipality of Beutelsbach united with the then-independent municipalities of Endersbach, Strümpfelbach, Großheppach and Schnait, to form a new municipality known as Weinstadt.

== Economy ==
The Remstalkellerei ("Rems Valley Winery") is headquartered in Beutelsbach. The Remstalkellerei is one of the largest wine producers in Germany with approximately 610 hectares of vineyards, which are managed by approximately 1,500 members.

== Coat of arms ==
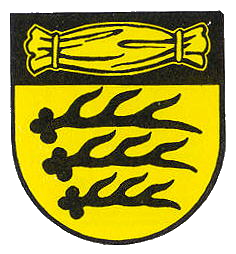

The blazon of the former municipality's coat of arms reads: "Unter schwarzem Schildhaupt, darin ein liegender goldener Beutel, in Gold drei liegende schwarze Hirschstange" ("under a black banner, on which a golden pouch lies, with three black deer antlers horizontal in a field of gold").

The coat of arms was first displayed on the town hall gate archway in 1577 as a market town symbol.

== People ==
- The German theologian Otto Knoch died on November 17, 1993, in Beutelsbach.

== Literature ==
- Der Rems-Murr-Kreis. Konrad Theiss Verlag. Stuttgart 1980, ISBN 3-8062-0243-5.
