= Schnait =

- Stadtteil of Weinstadt
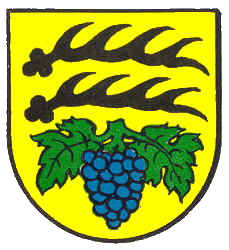
- Coat of arms
- Interactive map of Schnait
- Location within Germany Location within Baden-Württemberg
- Coordinates: 48°47′26″N 9°24′14″E
- Country: Germany
- State: Baden-Württemberg
- District: Rems-Murr
- Town: Weinstadt

Population
  - Total: 3,226
- Time zone: UTC+01:00 (CET)
  - Summer (DST): UTC+02:00 (CEST)

Schnait is a town district or Stadtteil within the town of Weinstadt ("Wine City") in Rems-Murr district, Baden-Württemberg, Germany.

Schnait was first mentioned in 1238 as Snait. It belonged to the Oberamt Schorndorf. In 1938 it became part of the district Waiblingen. Since 1973 Schnait belongs to the Rems-Murr-Kreis.

On January 1, 1975 the municipality of Schnait united with the then-independent municipalities of Beutelsbach, Endersbach, Strümpfelbach and Großheppach, to form the new municipality Weinstadt.
