= Poor Conrad =

Secret society

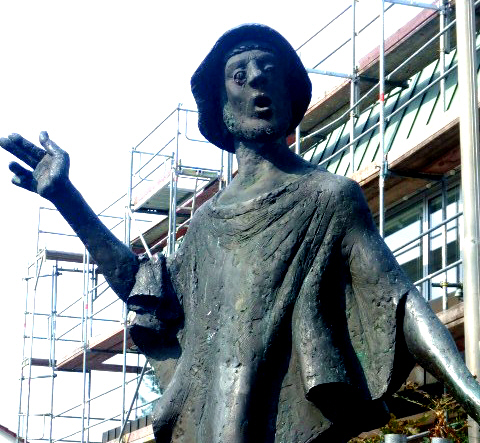
Modern statue of Peter Gaiß, Weinstadt

The Poor Conrad (German: Armer Konrad, also Armer Kunz) was the name of several secret peasants' leagues, which in 1514 revolted against the rule of Duke Ulrich of Württemberg. The rebels adopted the term used by the nobility to mock them, meaning "poor fellow" or "poor devil". The battle flag of the rebels depicted a farmer lying in front of a cross, under the words Der arme Conrad.

== History ==
Duke Ulrich's excessive lifestyle had badly dented the Württemberg treasury, while the rural population was increasingly beset by their seignory under the condition of serfdom. Instead of cutting down his expenses, the duke raised further taxes in 1513 to finance his planned campaign against the Duchy of Burgundy. As the citizens of Stuttgart and Tübingen refused to pay a wealth tax, he had an excise imposed on meat, wine, and fruit to the disadvantage of the unprivileged population. The crop failures of 1508 and 1513 meant that small farmers were unable to pay the new taxes. This in turn, led to a hike in food prices. In order to collect the tax, Ulrich had the unit of measurement of weight reduced, a move which aroused general indignation. For example, for the price of one kilogram of flour, one received only 700 grammes.

As a protest against the measure, Peter Gaiß (Gaispeter) from Beutelsbach carried out a "trial by ordeal" on 2 May 1514: the new weights of Duke Ulrich were to be thrown in the Rems River at Großheppach. Were they to float, they would be legitimized; were they to sink, they would be proven fraudulent. As was to be expected, the ordeal "proved" the peasants right.

The next day, the authorities reacted and insisted on the surrender of the weights, a demand that Peter Gaiß rejected. Instead he convoked a growing crowd of dissatisfied peasants, which moved to the nearby town of Schorndorf, where little damage was inflicted, but the duke was so concerned that he dropped the unpopular tax. This calmed the situation in the Rems Valley temporarily.

Shortly thereafter, however, further riots broke out in Leonberg and Grüningen, encouraged by town priest Rainhard Gaißlin. Peter Gaiß also travelled again across the country, persuading people to riot against Duke Ulrich. In mid-July, the rebels occupied Schorndorf for ten days; the Duke narrowly escaped the turmoil. Marching through the Württemberg estates, the rebels set up a camp on the Kappelberg spur near Beutelsbach. However, news of approaching well-armed ducal troops persuaded more and more rebels to leave the camp. Finally the Poor Conrad rebellion collapsed quietly. Ducal troops occupied the Rems Valley without resistance, hauling the remaining 1,700 rebels off to Schorndorf, where they were tortured, imprisoned, and their commanders beheaded. Fines had to be paid, and they were deprived of their rights.

== Legacy ==
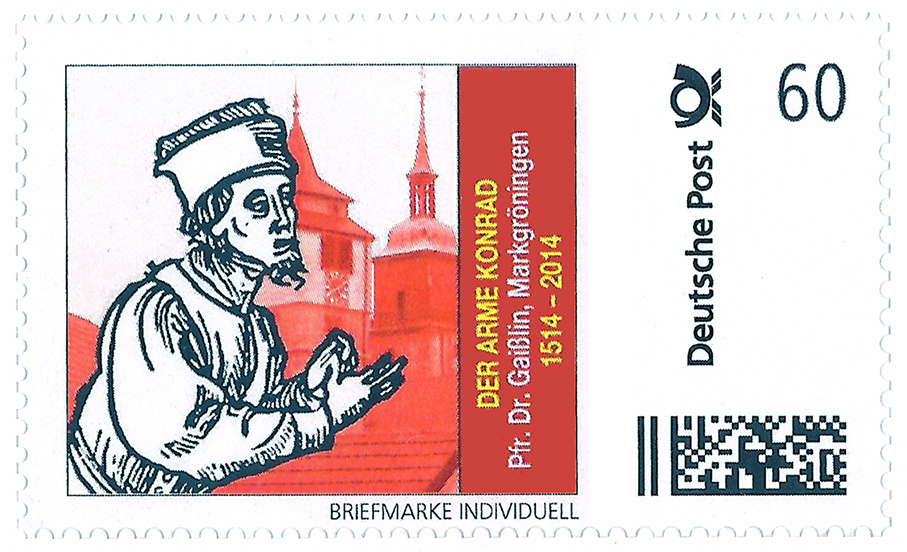
A German personalised stamp commemorating the 500th anniversary of the rebellion.

The peace did not last long. Some ten years later, the rural population rebelled again, leading to the German Peasants' War.

2014 marked the 500th anniversary of the rebellion. A stamp was issued and several exhibitions were held in Fellbach, Schorndorf, Weinstadt and Waiblingen.
