= Weinstadt =

- Town
- View of one district, with vineyards in the foreground

- Flag Coat of arms

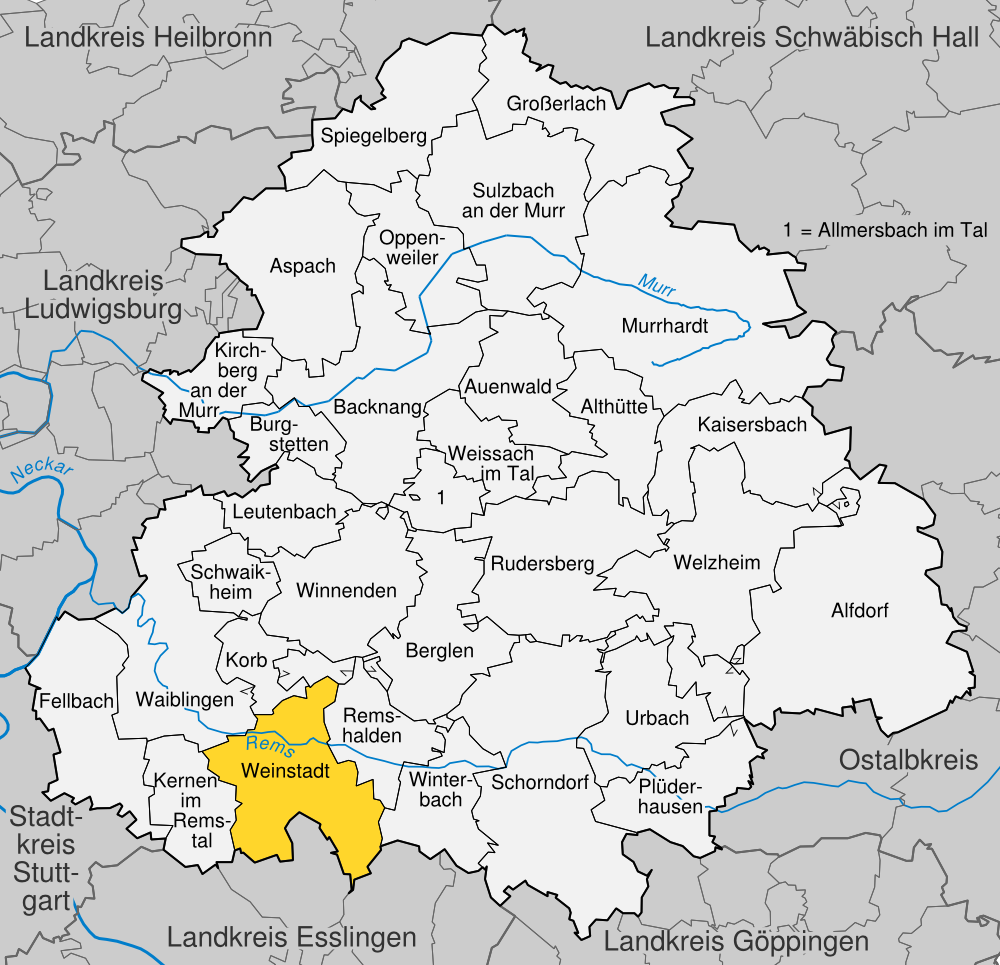
- Location of Weinstadt within Rems-Murr-Kreis district
- Interactive map of Weinstadt
- Location within Germany Location within Baden-Württemberg
- Coordinates: 48°48′40″N 09°21′56″E
- Country: Germany
- State: Baden-Württemberg
- Admin. region: Stuttgart
- District: Rems-Murr-Kreis
- Subdivisions: 5 Stadtteile

Government
  - Mayor (2016–24): Michael Scharmann (FW)

Area
  - Total: 31.71 km^{2} (12.24 sq mi)
- Elevation: 241 m (791 ft)

Population (2025-12-31)
  - Total: 26,926
  - Density: 849.1/km^{2} (2,199/sq mi)
- Time zone: UTC+01:00 (CET)
  - Summer (DST): UTC+02:00 (CEST)
- Postal codes: 71384
- Dialling codes: 07151
- Vehicle registration: WN
- Website: www.weinstadt.de

Weinstadt (German pronunciation: [ˈvaɪnˌʃtat], lit. 'Wine City'; Swabian: Waistadt) is a town in the Rems-Murr district, in the state of Baden-Württemberg, Germany. It is located in the Rems Valley approximately 15 km east of Stuttgart. Its population in 2012 was 25,998.

The town is composed of five districts or Stadtteile which were formerly independent towns and villages. They are Beutelsbach, Endersbach, Großheppach, Strümpfelbach, and Schnait. The five towns were combined to form the city of Weinstadt in 1975. Today, the city is the 6th largest in Rems-Murr-Kreis.

As the name implies, Weinstadt is best known for its vineyards and production of wine. The Remstalkellerei (Rems Valley Winery), in the Beutelsbach neighborhood of Weinstadt, is a cooperative owned by the local growers and is the tenth-largest winery in Germany.

From 1958 through 1976, Stanford University in California, United States, maintained an "overseas campus" for Stanford undergraduates in Beutelsbach. The hilltop campus is now the Landgut Burg hotel and conference center.

== Geography ==
=== Geographical location ===
The city limits of Weinstadt span the river Rems, which flows through the Rems Valley (Remstal) into the Neckar Basin. The Rems flows into the Neckar at Remseck am Neckar. The Stadtteil Großheppach lies to the north of the Rems, while the other Stadtteile lie to the south. At the southern part of the city, the vineyards climb the slopes at the edge of Schurwald. All Stadtteile have vineyards; that is the source for the name "Weinstadt."

=== Neighboring cities and municipalities ===
The following cities and municipalities border Weinstadt (listed clockwise from west): Kernen im Remstal; Waiblingen; Korb, an exclave of Waiblingen; Remshalden; and Winterbach (all in Rems-Murr-Kreis); and Baltmannsweiler and Aichwald (in Landkreis Esslingen).

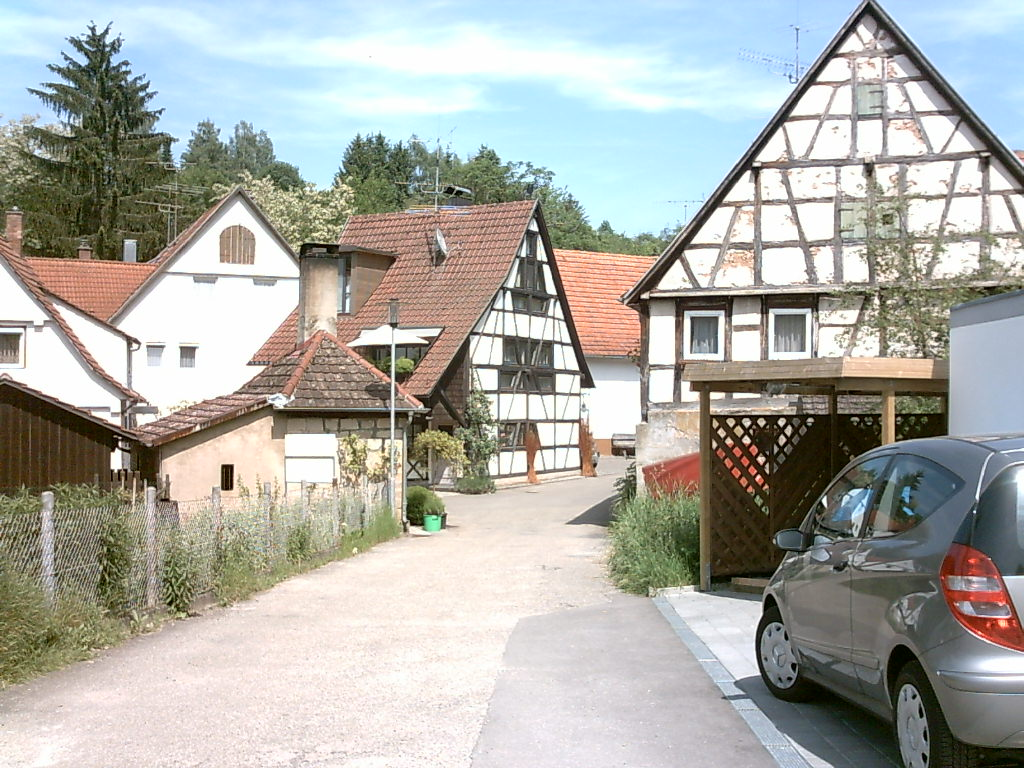
Baach 2006

=== Composition of the Stadtteile ===
Weinstadt is composed of the following Stadtteile (residents as of March 31, 2010, noted in parentheses):

- Beutelsbach (8,464)
- Endersbach (7,351)
- Großheppach (4,485)
- Schnait (3,254)
- Strümpfelbach (2,411)

The borders of each Stadtteil follow exactly the pre-1975 town or village borders.

In addition to these Stadtteile, there are also some named residential areas, which, in some cases, do not have official boundaries. The farmstead Schönbühl, the estate Burg, and the settlement Benzach belong to Beutelsbach. The abandoned village Wintzen belongs to Endersbach. The Weiler Gundelsbach and the estate Wolfshof belong to Großheppach. The municipal area Baach and the estate Saffrichhof, as well as the abandoned village Mühlhöflein, belong to Schnait.

Kleinheppach, which is adjacent to Großheppach, is part of the municipality of Korb.

=== Development and land use planning ===
Weinstadt forms a local commercial center for 50,000 residents within the sub-metropolitan area of Waiblingen/Fellbach and the Stuttgart metropolitan area.

== History ==
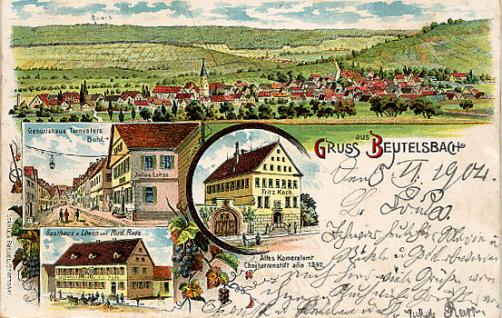
Beutelsbach in 1904

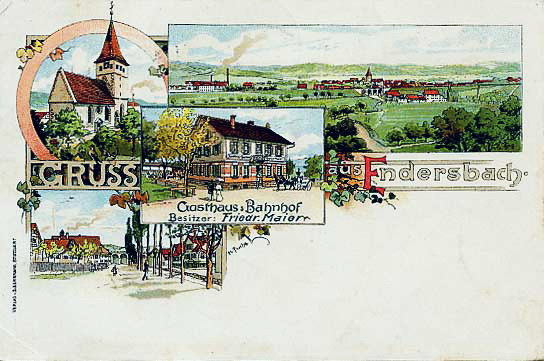
Endersbach around 1900

Weinstadt came into existence as part of a district reform on January 1, 1975, in which the then-independent towns of Beutelsbach, Endersbach, Großheppach, and Schnait were combined. Strümpfelbach had previously been annexed by Endersbach on January 1, 1973. Because of this earlier structure, there are now five town centers within Weinstadt. The town centers of Endersbach and Beutelsbach give the impression of independent cities.

The newly created municipality of Weinstadt had more than 20,000 residents when it was founded. Even so, it wasn't until 1978 that the administration applied for so-called Große Kreisstadt status. The state government approved the application with an effective date of January 1, 1979.

Coat of Arms of the Stadtteile

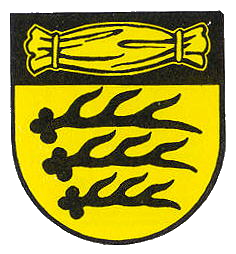
Beutelsbach

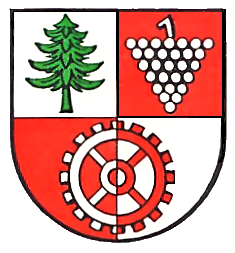
Endersbach

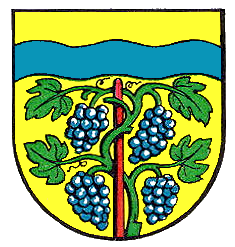
Großheppach

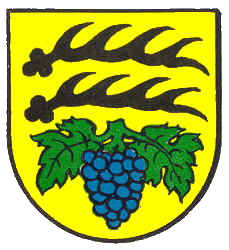
Schnait

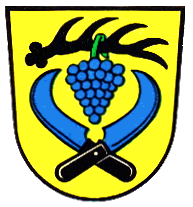
Strümpfelbach im Remstal

The original towns were old Württemberg settlements which have a long history.

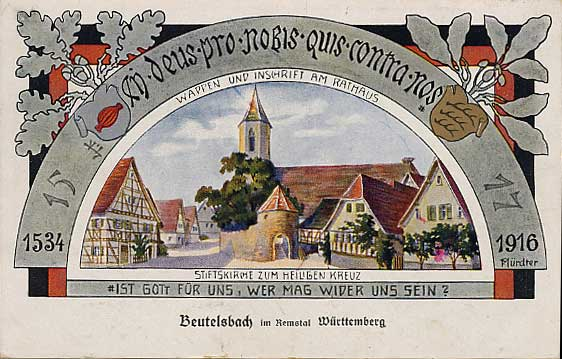
Collegiate Church of the House of Württemberg

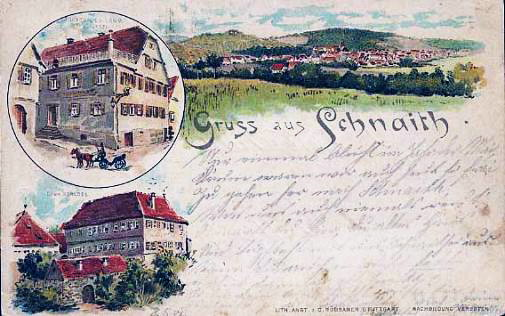
Schnait around 1900

Prior to uniting to form the city of Weinstadt in 1975, all five then-towns were added to the newly created Rems-Murr district as part of a district reform in 1973.

=== Endersbach ===
Endersbach was first identified as Andrespach in 1278 and probably joined Württemberg as part of Schorndorf. Unlike Beutelsbach, Endersbach belonged from 1762 until 1765 and then again from 1807 to the Oberamt Waiblingen (an administrative district within Württemberg), which in 1938 became the Waiblingen district.

=== Schnait ===
Schnait was originally identified as Snait. The town likely joined Württemberg along with Beutelsbach, although other feudal lords had rights to the town until 1605. It belonged – like Beutelsbach – to Amt/Oberamt Schorndorf (an administrative district within Württemberg). After the dissolution of Oberamt Schorndorf in 1938, Schnait joined the Waiblingen district.

=== Strümpfelbach ===
Strümpfelbach was first identified as Striumphilbach in 1265 and likely became part of Württemberg in the 13th century. The town belonged to the Amt/Oberamt Schorndorf (an administrative district within Württemberg) and then from 1762 until 1765 and then again from 1807 to the Oberamt Waiblingen (an administrative district within Württemberg), which in 1938 became the Waiblingen district.

=== Religions ===
As a result of belonging to the Grafschaft and later Duchy of Württemberg, the Reformation was brought to all five of the now-Stadtteile of Weinstadt. For centuries the towns were almost exclusively Protestant. The five evangelical parishes belonged, in accordance with the town governance, to the respective ecclesiastical districts of the Oberamts of Waiblingen and Schorndorf under the auspices of the Evangelical-Lutheran Church in Württemberg. Endersbach, Großheppach and Strümpfelbach belong to the ecclesiastical district of Waiblingen, while Beutelsbach and Schnait belong to the ecclesiastical district of Schorndorf.

Because of the influx of Catholics from Bavaria during the building of the railroad and especially after the Second World War, Catholic ecclesiastical districts and churches took root in what is now Weinstadt. In 1956 the Church of St. Anna was built in Beutelsbach, and the Church of Saint Andrew was built in Endersbach. In 1971 Schnait received its own Church of the Holy Cross, the members of which belong to the Beutelsbach parish. Shortly thereafter in 1974, Großheppach also received its own Catholic church—the Church of Saint Stephen. The congregation of the Church of Saint Stephen, as well as the Catholic Church members from Strümpfelbach, belong to the parish of Endersbach. All of the Weinstadt Catholic churches belong to the Deanery of Waiblingen of the Diocese of Rottenburg-Stuttgart. In addition, the New Apostolic Church and the Jehovah's Witnesses are also represented.

=== Population growth ===
The values below are either the results of the census (¹) or the official published statistics for the respective city office (only primary residence).

Date	Number of Residents
December 31, 1975	22,162
December 31, 1980	23,244
December 31, 1985	23,255
May 27, 1987 ¹	23,148

Date	Number of Residents
December 31, 1990	23,999
December 31, 1995	24,941
December 31, 2000	25,643
December 31, 2005	26,245

Date	Number of Residents
December 31, 2008	26,005
December 31, 2010	26,421

¹ Census Results

== Politics ==
=== City council ===
Since the most recent local election in Baden-Württemberg in 2014, the city council of Weinstadt has had 26 members. Voter participation in that election was 52.42%. The results of the election were as follows:

Christian Democratic Union (CDU)	9 seats	(35.40%)
Free Voters Weinstadt (FWW)^{1}	7 seats	(27.71%)
Social Democratic Party (Germany) (SPD)	5 seats	(19.61%)
Green Party Open List (GOL)^{2}	5 seats	(17.28%)

The mayor is the head of the town council.

^{1}Free Voters Weinstadt e.V. (Free Voters Weinstadt), ^{2}Grüne Offene Liste Weinstadt (Green Open List Weinstadt)

=== Mayor ===
The mayor is the immediate head of the government of Weinstadt. When the city was recognized as a Große Kreisstadt on January 1, 1979, the mayor's title was changed from Bürgermeister to Oberbürgermeister. The mayor is elected directly by the eligible voters for an 8-year term and is the head of the city council. The mayor also has a deputy, whose title is Erster Bürgermeister or "first mayor."

Mayors:

- 1975–2000: Jürgen Hofer (FDP)
- 2000–2016: Jürgen Oswald (CDU)
- 2016–present: Michael Scharmann

=== Coat of arms ===
Weinstadt coat of arms

The coat of arms of Weinstadt displays: "Unter goldenem Schildhaupt, darin eine liegende schwarze Hirschstange, in Schwarz eine goldene Traube" ("a golden banner, across which a deer antler lies, and on black a golden bunch of grapes.") The city flag is yellow and black. Both the coat of arms and the flag were awarded to Weinstadt on May 3, 1976, by the Landratsamt of Rems-Murr county.

The grape bunch symbolizes wine growing, for which the city was named. The Württemberg deer antler references the lengthy inclusion of the former villages and towns of Weinstadt within Württemberg.

=== Sister cities ===
Weinstadt has maintained a partnership with the French city Parthenay since 1980 and with the Polish city Międzychód since 1990. City friendships also exist with the cities Abrantes (Portugal), Arnedo (Spain), Casale Monferrato (Italy) and Tipperary (Ireland).

== Culture and interesting sites ==
Cultural events occur predominantly in the various halls in the city limits: Halle Beutelsbach, Jahnhalle Endersbach, Prinz-Eugen-Halle Großheppach, Schnaiter Halle, and Strümpfelbacher Halle. There is additionally the Alte Kelter in Strümpfelbach, which can also be used for events.

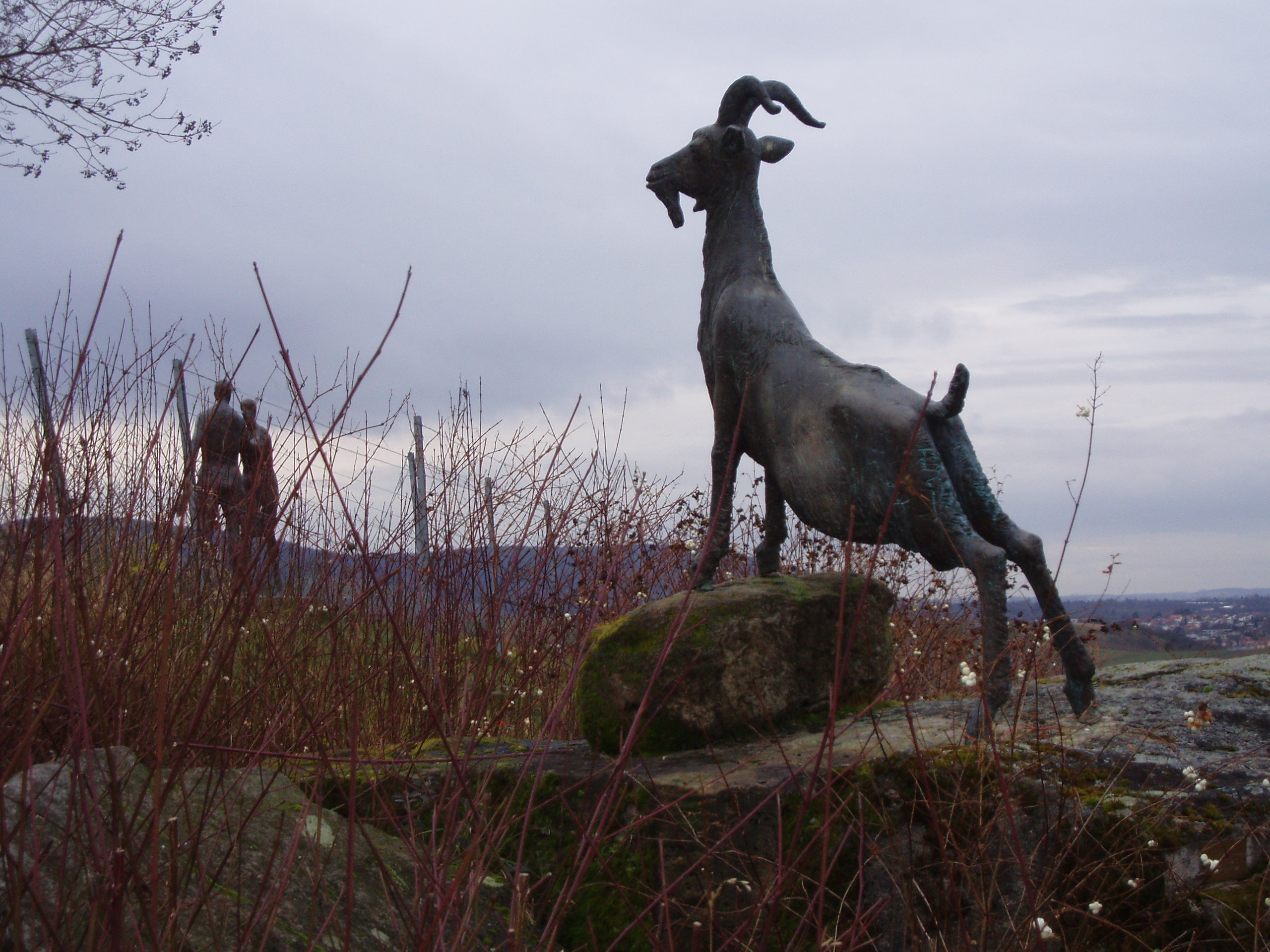
Skulpturenpfad

In the vineyard hills of Strümpfelbach there is a sculpture walk. Twenty-nine bronze and stone sculptures from three generations of artists line the path through the vineyards of Strümpfelbach: bronze works by Professor Fritz Nuss and his son Professor Karl Ulrich Nuss as well as stone sculptures by Christoph Traub, the grandson of Professor Fritz Nuss.

The stone works by Schnait hobby sculptor and wine grower Ludwig Heeß can be observed along another sculpture walk in the vineyards, the Skulpturen- und Weinlehrweg Schnait (sculpture and wine discovery trail). Among these works are the Weinpresse (wine press), Traubenwagen (grape cart), Gölte, Ablässe, Weintisch (wine table), Wengerterfrau (wine grower woman), and Traubenzuber (tub of grapes).

A plaque in the Endersbach cemetery memorializes the baptist conscientious objector Alfred Herbst, who was killed in 1943 in Brandenburg-Görden.

The viewpoint Karlstein looks out from the vineyard hills between Endersbach and Strümpfelbach.

=== Museums ===
- The local history museum in Beutelsbach (Heimatmuseum Beutelsbach) in the former town hall houses the peasant revolt exhibit and the East German Heimatstube (home-town room).
- Both Endersbach and Strümpfelbach have their own local history museum. The museum in Endersbach contains oil paintings and pastel drawings by the painter Karl Wilhelm Bauerle (aka Carl Bowerley) (1831–1912), who was born in Endersbach.
- The Nuss-Museum in Strümpfelbach as well as the sculpture walk in Strümpfelbach, which wanders among the vineyard hills.
- The Silcher Museum of the Swabian Choir Association in Schnait, housed in the birthplace of the composer Friedrich Silcher, presents his life and works.

=== Architecture ===
The most significant structure and symbol of the city is the Stiftskirche (collegiate church) in Beutelsbach, the former burial location of the House of Württemberg. The current church was constructed in 1522, although there had previously been a church on that site.

The Endersbach parish church is a late-Gothic former fortified church. The nave was built in 1468, the choir and sacristy in 1491, and the tower in 1769. In 1730 the nave was redecorated in Baroque style.

The church in Schnait is more recent. It was initially built in 1748 as a so-called Emporensaal (gallery hall).

The parish church in Strümpfelbach is a late-Gothic choir-tower structure, which was expanded in 1784.

In Großheppach, the Schloss Großheppach (Großheppach Castle) from 1592 is particularly worth seeing. Since around 1900 it has belonged to the family von Gaisberg, and by 1749 it belonged to a maternal-line ancestor of this family. Today, it's one of the few privately owned castles in Baden-Württemberg. The Schloss Schnait (Schnait Castle) in Schnait is a favorite day-trip destination for those interested in half-timbered houses.

=== Regular events ===
A yearly spring market and harvest market take place in Beutelsbach, and Beutelsbach also hosts a Weindorf (wine village festival), which takes place around May 1, and draws visitors from near and far. In Endersbach, there is a Fensterblümlesmarkt (window flower market) on the second Wednesday in May, a wine festival and merchant's market in September, and a Christmas market in December. In Schnait there's a Martinimarkt (St. Martin's Market) each year, and in Großheppach there is a Festival of 100 Wines at the Häckermühle in September. The yearly 3-day Kelterfest takes place in Strümpfelbach. The Nacht der Keller (Night of the Cellars) is especially noteworthy. At that event, the various wine producers present their wine in vaulted cellars throughout Weinstadt.

Additionally, the Bacchus Festival, which the Stadtteil take turns organizing, takes place every two to three years. In May and June, wine tastings take place in the vineyards of Großheppach (on Mother's day weekend) and in Endersbach.

Also known in the region are the Beutelsbach Kirbe (harvest festival) and Schnait Kirbe, which take place in October and August respectively.

== Economy and infrastructure ==
The economy of the then-cities that now make up Weinstadt was primarily based on wine production. With 489 hectares of vineyard (as of 2011), Weinstadt has the fourth-largest area of any wine-producing community in Württemberg. Today, some medium-sized businesses have also been established in Weinstadt. In addition, many employees commute to the nearby cities, particularly Waiblingen and Stuttgart.

=== Transit ===
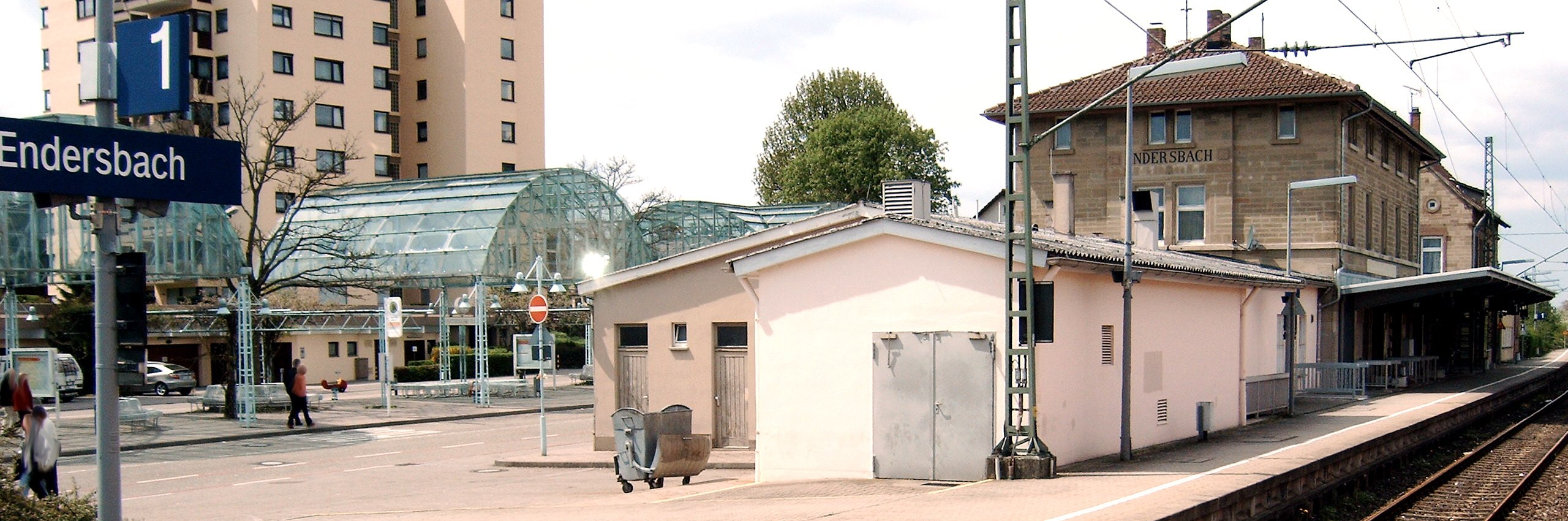
Busbahnhof und Bahnhof Endersbach

The Bundesstraße 29 Stuttgart–Schwäbisch Gmünd–Aalen crosses the city.

Weinstadt is located on the Remsbahn Stuttgart–Aalen (–Nürnberg). The Stuttgart S-Bahn line S2 also follows this stretch of track (Schorndorf–Stuttgart–Stuttgart Airport–Filderstadt). The following stations lie within the city limits of Weinstadt: Stetten-Beinstein, Endersbach and Beutelsbach. Multiple bus lines provide service within the city limits. All lines can be used based on a unified price structure under the authority of the Stuttgart Transit Association (Verkehrsverbund Stuttgart or VVS).

=== Media ===
The daily newspaper Waiblinger Kreiszeitung covers Weinstadt. Each household receives the weekly Weinstadt Woche (Weinstadt Week), the official communication organ of the city, at no cost. Furthermore, the weekly Blättle (in some cases s’Blättle), which reports on the church, club, and other events from the previous week, is also delivered free of charge.

=== Education ===
In Weinstadt there is a Gymnasium (Remstal-Gymnasium), a Realschule (Reinhold-Nägele-Realschule), a Werkrealschule (Erich Kästner-Schule) and a Special Education School (Vollmarschule), which are all located in the Bildungszentrum Weinstadt (Weinstadt Educational Center) between Endersbach and Beutelsbach.

In addition, each Stadtteil has its own elementary school, of which the schools in Endersbach (Silcherschule) and Großheppach (Friedrich-Schiller-Schule) carry special names.

Two private schools—the Fachschule für Sozialpädagogik and the Fachschule für Altenpflege of the Großheppacher Schwesternschaft round out the educational offerings in Weinstadt. The Volkshochschule Unteres Remstal e.V. (Community College of Lower Rems Valley) has its secondary office in the Haus Wabe in Weinstadt.

=== Clubs ===
With around 1700 members, the SV Weinstadt (Sport Club Weinstadt) is, along with the VfL Endersbach, one of the two largest sport clubs. It was founded in 1897 as the TSV Beutelsbach and was renamed SV Weinstadt in 2001. SV Weinstadt activities include: handball, track and field, swimming, Taekwondo, table tennis, gymnastics, and volleyball, among others.

VfL Endersbach was founded in 1908 and also has approximately 1700 members. As a multiple-department club it has a broad offering. Departments include: gymnastics, handball, track and field, swimming, skiing, basketball, heart sport, and disabled sport. For all children and youths, the VfL youth department puts on various additional activities.

There are three football clubs in Weinstadt: the SC Weinstadt, the TSV Großheppach, and the TSV Strümpfelbach. The first two of these came into existence when the FV Weinstadt split in 2005.

In 1997 the Handballspielgemeinschaft Weinstadt (HSG Weinstadt) was formed from the handball departments of the VfL Endersbach and the TSV Großheppach. In 2011, it combined with the handball department of the SV Weinstadt to form the Spielgemeinschaft Weinstadt Handball (SG Weinstadt). With five active men, two active women, and for the most part doubly populated youth teams of all age groups, the SG Weinstadt Handball is one of the largest handball clubs in Rems-Murr county.

The BG Endersbach is a basketball club with a home in the VfL Endersbach.

The Tennisclub Weinstadt Endersbach e.V., founded on December 7, 1967, is the oldest tennis club in Weinstadt.

== Notable people ==
=== Honorary citizens ===
The city of Weinstadt and/or the earlier townships have bestowed the right of honorary citizenship on the following people (in addition to others):

- 1949: Karl and Oskar Birkel, owners and managers of the 1909-1998 Endersbach-based Schwabennudelwerke B. Birkel Söhne (Endersbach)
- 1950: Christian Graze, owner of the Graze Bienenzuchtgerätefabrik, which has been based in Endersbach since 1872 (Endersbach)
- 1972: Sophie Weishaar, senior teacher and chronicler (Strümpfelbach)
- 1972: Karl-Christian Birkel, owner and manager of the Schwabennudelwerke B. Birkel Söhne (Endersbach)
- 1974: Hermann Plessing, Mayor of Beutelsbach (Beutelsbach)
- 1977: Prof. Fritz Nuss, Skulptor from Strümpfelbach
- 1983: Walter Eberhardt, Mayor of Strümpfelbach
- 2007: Jürgen Hofer, Mayor of Weinstadt from 1975 to 2000
- Karl Baisch, owner and manager of the Fabrik für Arzt- und Zahnarztpraxenmobiliar (factory for medicinal and dental furnishings) and primary donor for the construction of the indoor swimming pool in Beutelsbach
- Karl Dippon, wine grower and politician

=== Sons and daughters of the city ===
- Peter Gais, Gaispeter from Beutelsbach, led 1514 the peasant revolt of the Poor Conrad against the Duke of Württemberg
- Georg Daniel Auberlen (1728–1784), schoolmaster, musician, and composer
- Philipp Friedrich Silcher (1789–1860), song composer
- Karl Wilhelm Bauerle (English: Carl Bowerley) (1831–1912), painter, from 1869 at the court of Queen Victoria
- Karl Dippon (1901–1981), wine grower and politician, member of the state parliament
- Heinrich von Idler (1802–1878), Württemberg Oberamtmann, member of the state parliament
- Mathias Richling (born 1953), cabaret artist

=== People who lived and worked in Weinstadt ===
- Johann Jakob Thill (1747–1772), poet esteemed by Friedrich Hölderlin
- Gotthilf Fischer (1928–2020), choral conductor, lived in Weinstadt
- Jürgen Rohwer (1924–2015), naval historian, lived in Weinstadt

== Literature ==
- Sophie Weishaar: Strümpfelbach im Remstal 1265–1965. 1966, Verlag Eugen Hauchler, Leinfelden and Biberach an der Riß.
- Walter, Heinz E. (Hrsg.): Das Ortsbuch von Endersbach 1278–1978. 1978, Ortsbücher-Verlag, Burg Liebenstein.
- Ulrich Stolte: Dichter im amusischen Württemberg. Ein neues Autograph von Friedrich Hölderlins Idol Johann Jakob Thill. In: Stuttgarter Arbeiten zur Germanistik, Nr. 423. Stuttgart: Hans-Dieter Heinz, Akademischer Verlag 2004 [2005], S. 95–110. (ISBN 3-88099-428-5.)
- Wolf Eiermann: Das unbekannte Oeuvre des deutsch-englischen Malers Carl Bauerle (1831–1912). In: Schwäbische Heimat 57 (2006), Issue 1 (Januar-März), S. 13–17.
