= Korb =

- Municipality
- Coat of arms

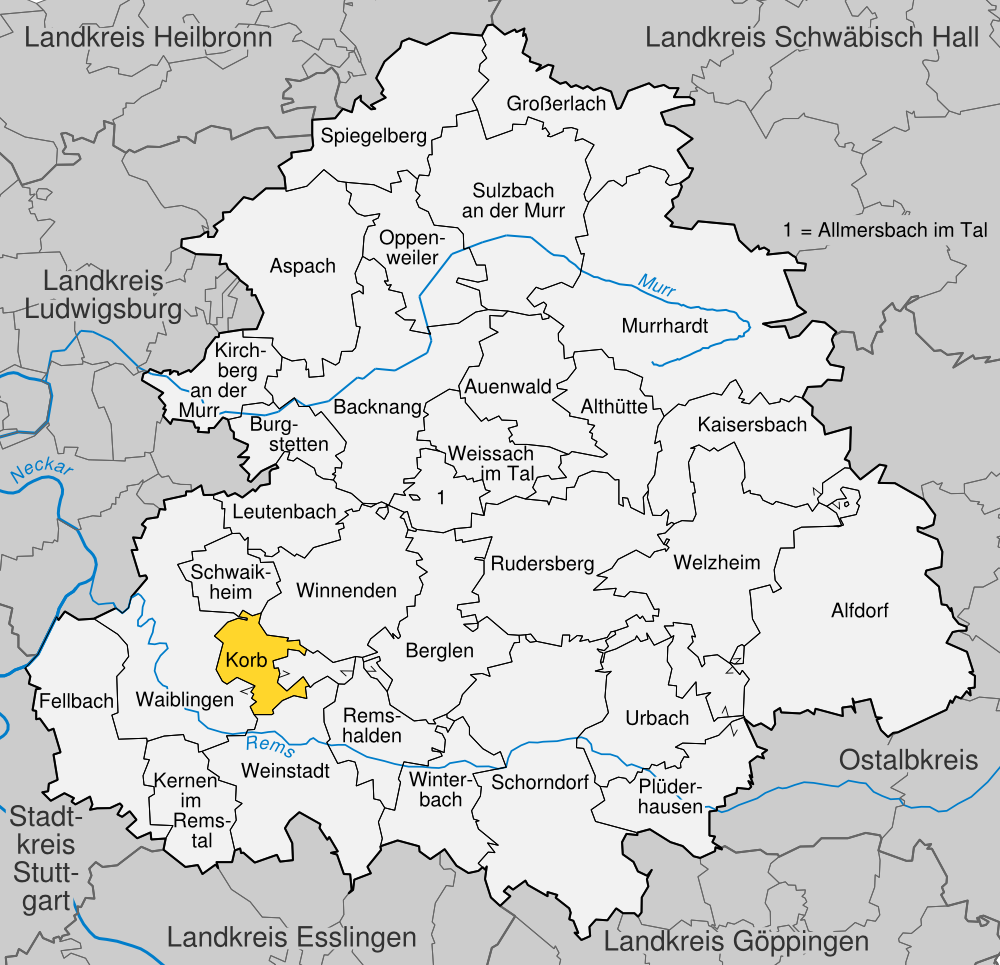
- Location of Korb within Rems-Murr-Kreis district
- Interactive map of Korb
- Location within Germany Location within Baden-Württemberg
- Coordinates: 48°50′30″N 09°21′40″E
- Country: Germany
- State: Baden-Württemberg
- Admin. region: Stuttgart
- District: Rems-Murr-Kreis

Government
  - Mayor (2017–25): Jochen Müller

Area
  - Total: 8.45 km^{2} (3.26 sq mi)
- Elevation: 296 m (971 ft)

Population (2025-12-31)
  - Total: 11,558
  - Density: 1,370/km^{2} (3,540/sq mi)
- Time zone: UTC+01:00 (CET)
  - Summer (DST): UTC+02:00 (CEST)
- Postal codes: 71404
- Dialling codes: 07151
- Vehicle registration: WN
- Website: www.korb.de

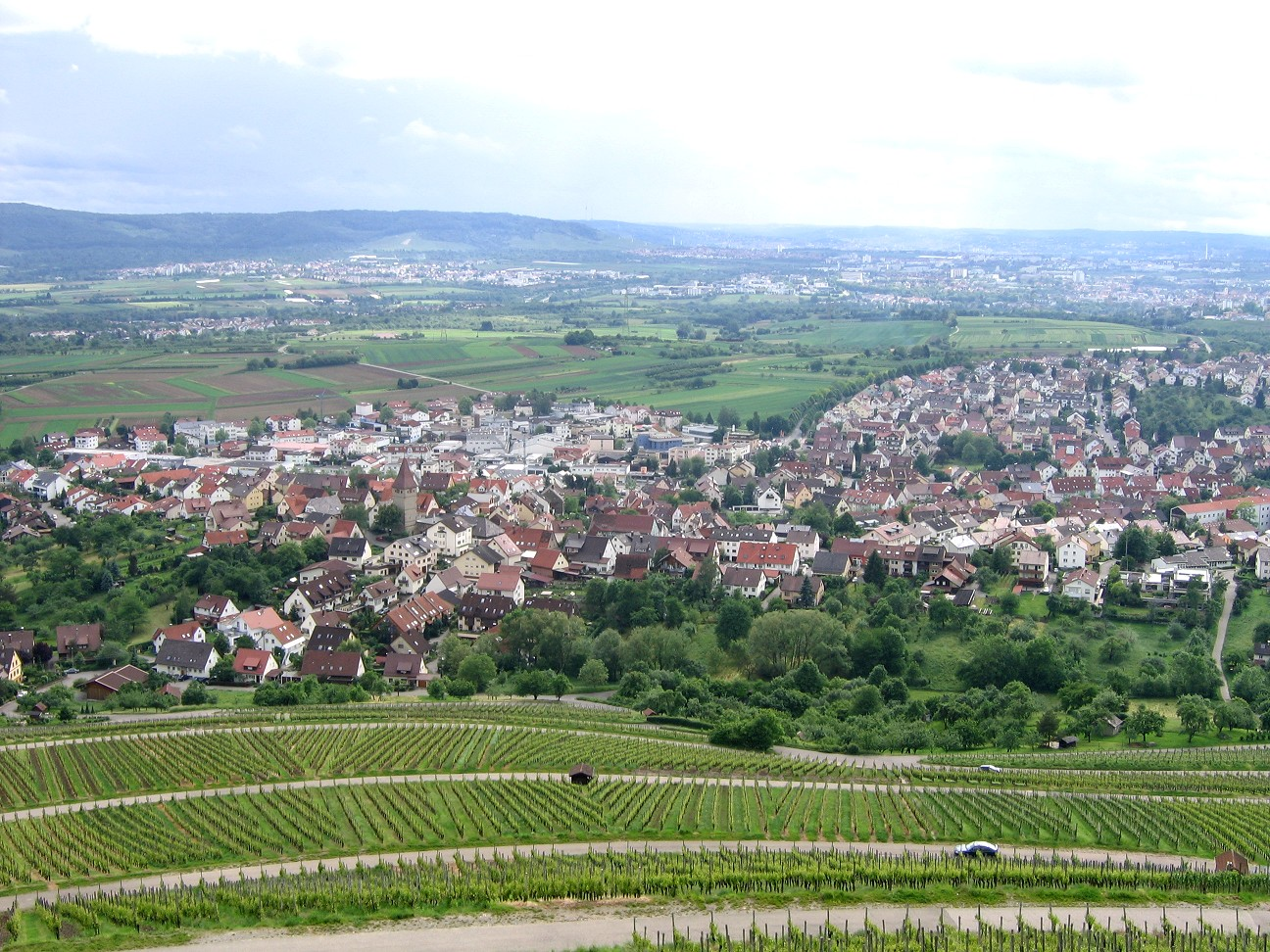
Korb

Korb is a municipality in the Rems-Murr district, in Baden-Württemberg, Germany. It is located 3 km east of Waiblingen, and 15 km northeast of Stuttgart. Korb is known for the wines produced in the area.

== History ==
=== Older History ===
The first known written mention dates from the year 1270. In an Esslingen document from the year 1270 is testified that the hospital in Esslingen has acquired land in Korb from the convent in Steinheim (Murr).

=== Middle Ages ===
Only in 1270 Korb will appear in the said document again. During the Thirty Years' War 1618-1648 there was great distress, and Korb was partially totally uninhabited (1636–38). Peasant uprising (1514 " Poor Conrad ") and the French invasion (1797) made also great suffer for Korb. Over the centuries the wine played a major role in the predominantly rural population. He made practically the main source of income.

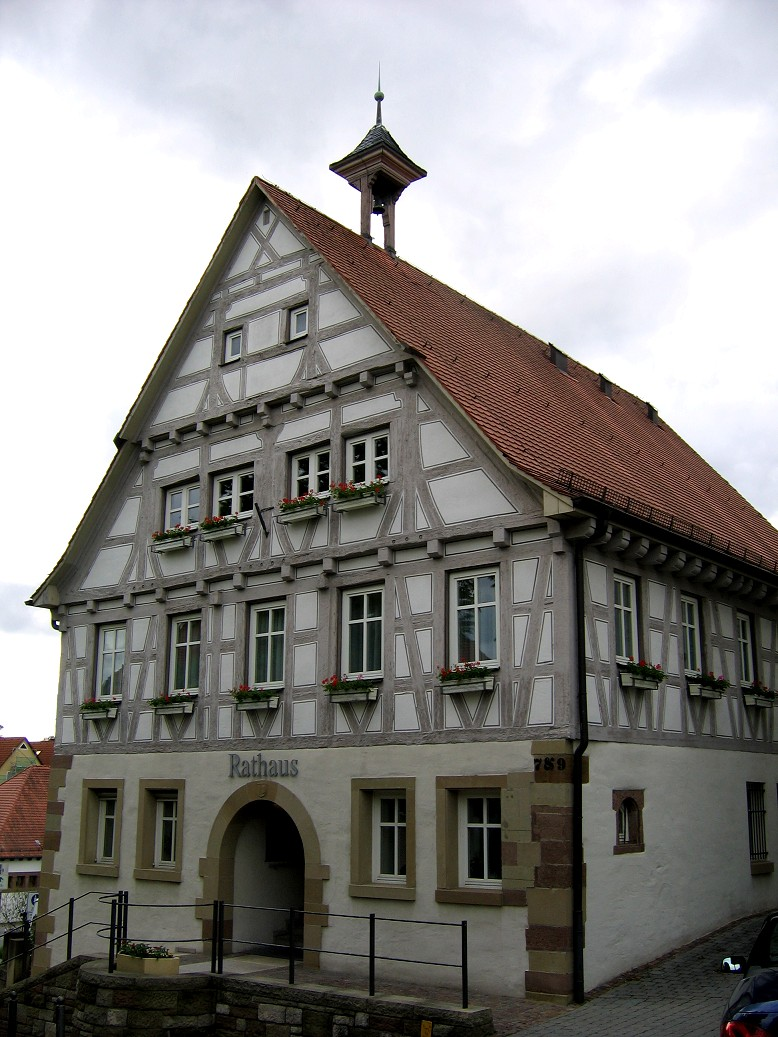
Korb Württemberg Town hall

=== Family History ===
During the Thirty Years' War the city suffered severe population losses. A few families were able to escape through temporary escape, including the Singer family.

=== Modern History/Modern Times ===
Only the industrialization around the turn of the century made the change for Korb to the today residential community. Before had been a catastrophic phylloxera infestation, all the vine yards in the Remstal had to be burned.

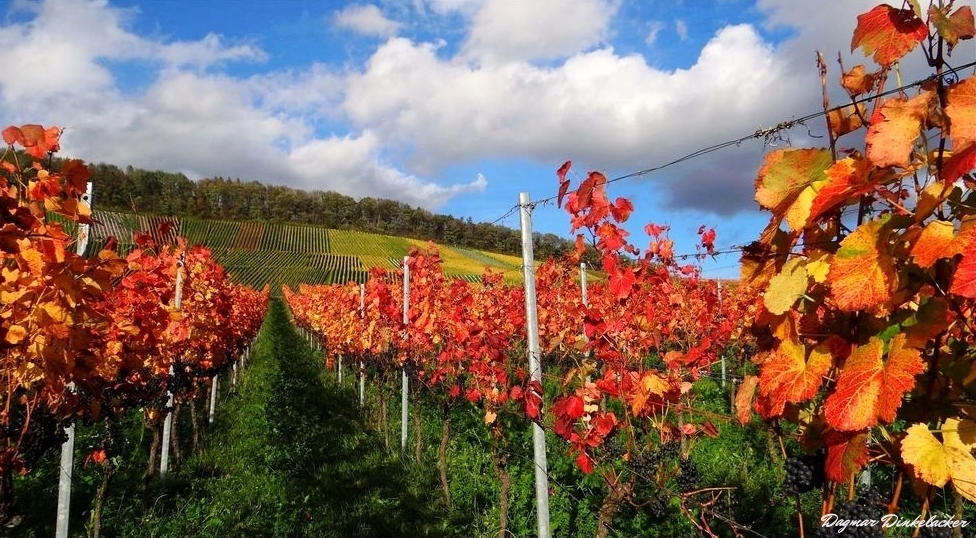
Autumn in Korb

== Demographics ==
Population development:

Year	Inhabitants
1990	9,730
2001	10,213
2011	9,910
2021	10,942

== Traffic ==
Korb is connected through the Bundesstraße 14 to the national road network. Coming from the north Korb is mostly connected about the exit Mundelsheim of the Bundesautobahn 81.

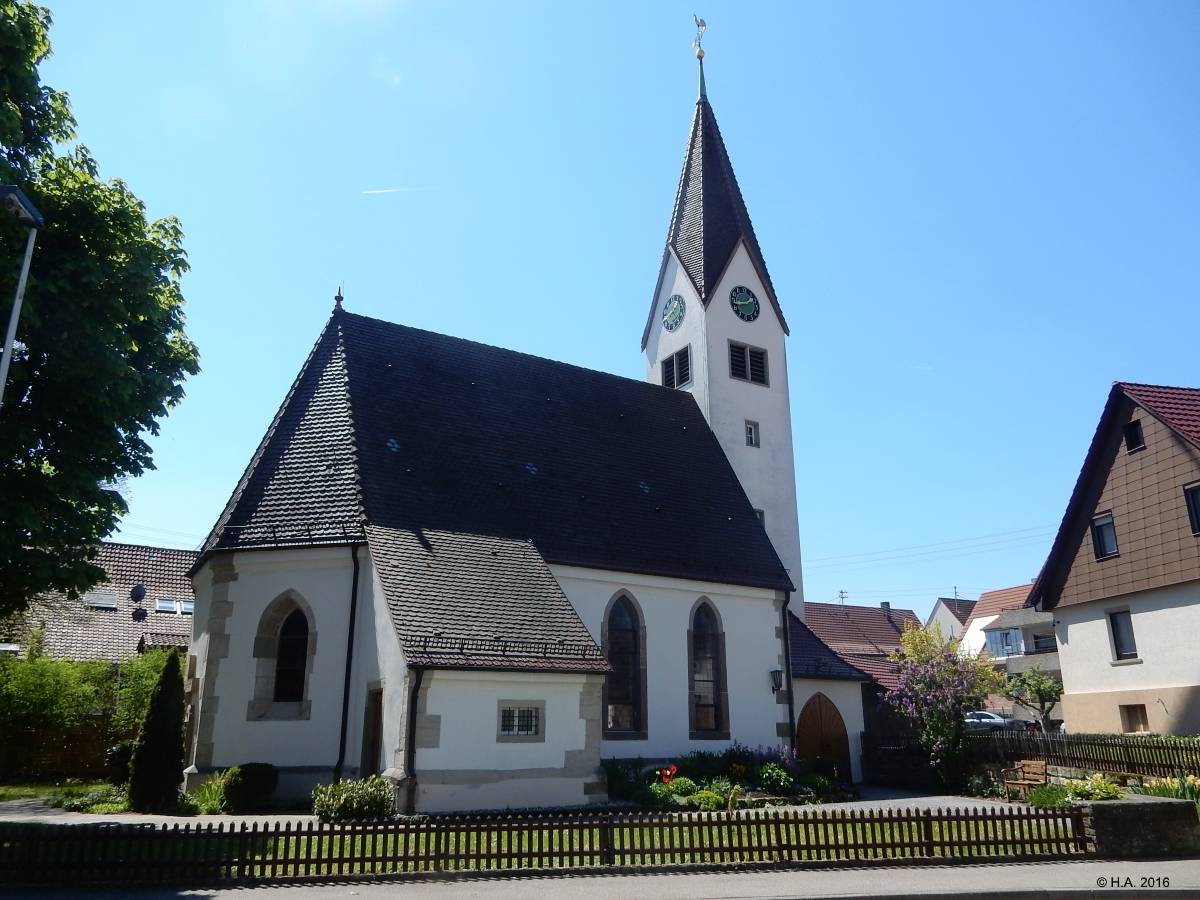
Kirche Kleinheppach 2016

Buses that run frequently connect Korb with the Waiblingen station, as well as over Kleinheppach with Endersbach station to Weinstadt.

== Notable peoples from Korb ==
- Jakob Friedrich Weishaar (1775–1834), president of the chamber of deputies of the Württemberg Landtag
- Alfred Leikam (1915–1992), Righteous among the Nations and mayor of Korb 1945
- Marco Fritz (born 1977), Football Bundesliga referee
- Yvonne Englich (born 1979), international successful wrestler

== Literature ==
- Ernst, Gottlob: Korb Steinreinach, Die Geschichte zweier Weinbausiedlungen. Korb 1970
- Heinrich, Jörg: Kirchenbuch Korb, 1662 bis 1807. Abschrift, Karlsruhe 2010
