= Großheppach =

- Stadtteil of Weinstadt
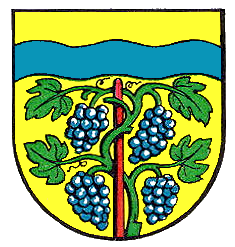
- Coat of arms
- Interactive map of Großheppach
- Location within Germany Location within Baden-Württemberg
- Coordinates: 48°49′N 09°23′E
- Country: Germany
- State: Baden-Württemberg
- District: Rems-Murr-Kreis
- Town: Weinstadt
- Elevation: 237 m (778 ft)

Population (2014)
  - Total: 4,502
- Time zone: UTC+01:00 (CET)
  - Summer (DST): UTC+02:00 (CEST)
- Postal codes: 71384
- Dialling codes: 07151

Großheppach ("big Heppach"; Grossheppach in English orthography) is a town district or Stadtteil within the town of Weinstadt ("Wine City") in Baden-Württemberg, Germany. The Stadtteil, which lies in the Rems Valley, is home to 4,398 residents (as of January 2012). Großheppach and Kleinheppach are located along the Heppach, a small stream that flows into the river Rems. The village of Großheppach, the Weiler Gundelsbach, and the homestead Wolfshof belong to the Stadtteil, which has borders that exactly match those of the earlier municipality of Großheppach. Its neighbor Kleinheppach ("small Heppach"), on the other hand, is now part of the municipality of Korb.

== History ==
Großheppach was first identified as Hegnesbach in 1236. Around 1350, the castle and village became a palatine fief under various feudal lords. Since 1456, parts of the village have been under Württemberg control; and since 1506, the entire village has belonged to Württemberg. Immediately upon becoming part of Württemberg, Großheppach belonged to the Württemberg administrative authority. Later, it became part of Oberamt Schorndorf (an administrative district within Württemberg). In 1807, it moved—like Endersbach—to Oberamt Waiblingen (a different administrative district within Württemberg).

Großheppach has always been shaped by wine production. In addition to the government of Württemberg, the cloister Weiler near Esslingen had tithing rights, and the Kartäuser cloister Christgarten (near Ederheim in the Donau Ries district) possessed a vineyard until the late 18th century and had a local economic branch (Pflegehof) in town.

The war council of the three field marshals—Prince Eugene of Savoy, Duke of Marlborough, and Margrave Louis William of Baden—took place on the June 12th and 13th, 1704, in Gasthaus Lamm. This war council lead to victory in the Battle of Blenheim.

On January 1, 1975, the previously independent towns of Beutelsbach, Endersbach, Strümpfelbach, Großheppach, and Schnait united to form the municipality of Weinstadt.

The coat of arms displays a field of gold with a blue wavy fess, under which a grape vine with four bunches of grapes in natural colors lies.

== Economy ==
Wine is produced in the locations Wanne and Steingrüble in Großheppach.

== People ==
- Johann Jakob Thill (* 22. Dezember 1747 in Stuttgart; † 31. März 1772 in Großheppach), poet esteemed by Friedrich Hölderlin
- Johann Christoph Friedrich von Stockmayer (* 12. September 1766; † 26. September 1821 in Teinach), Württemberg Oberamtmann (administrative district head)

== Literature ==
- Lothar Reinhard: Großheppach. Ludwigsburg 1968.
- Jörg Heinrich: Kirchenbuch Großheppach von 1558 bis 1744. Abschrift mit Ergänzungen. ("Church book of Großheppach from 1558 to 1744. Copy with supplements.") Pro Business, Berlin 2011, ISBN 978-3-86386-159-9.
