= Old Neckar =

Nature reserve in Baden-Württemberg, Germany

Nature and landscape conservation area Old Neckar
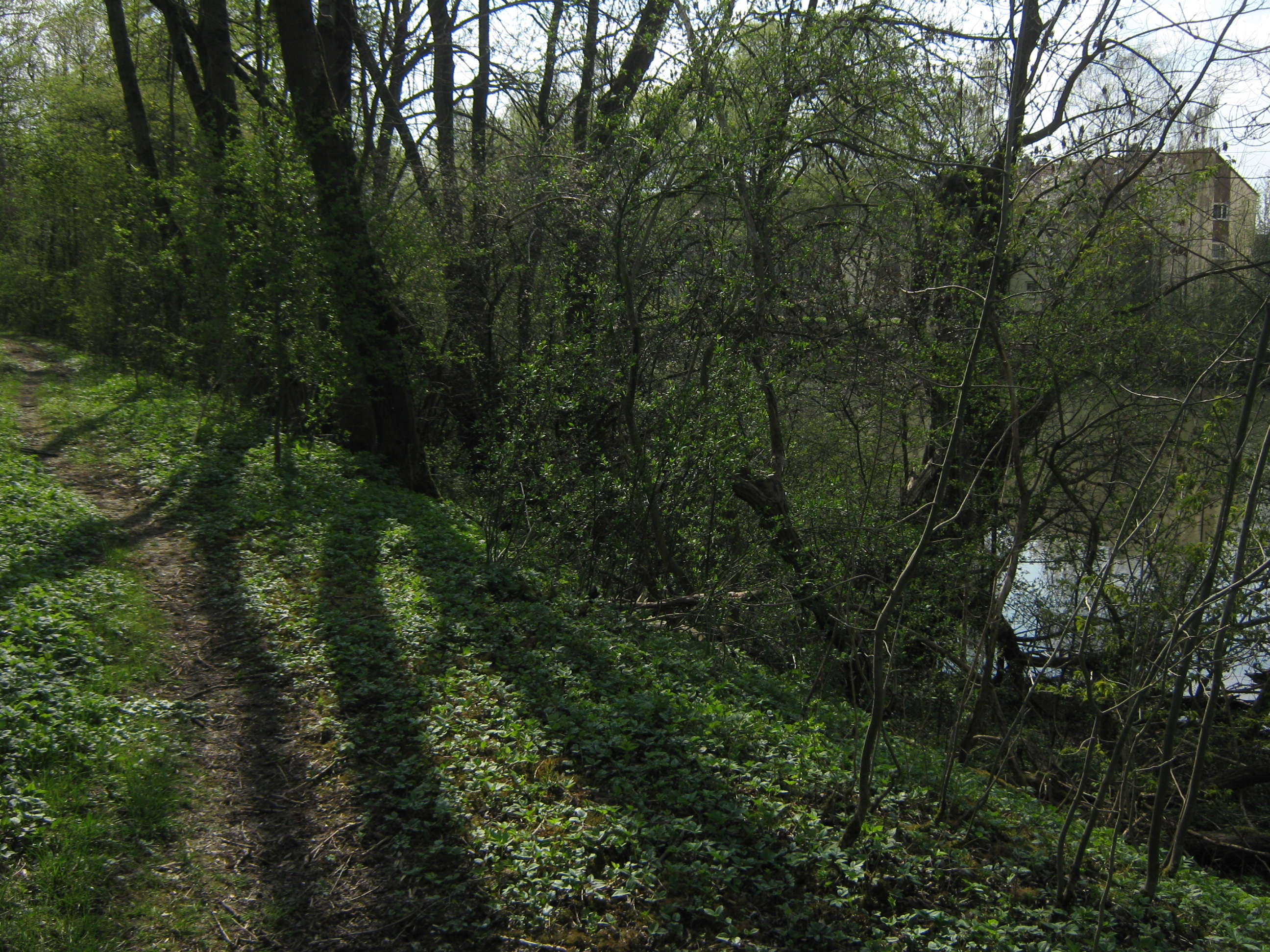
- Old Neckar Nature Reserve
- Interactive map of Nature and landscape conservation area Old Neckar
- Location: Deutschland, Baden-Württemberg, Esslingen (district), Altbach
- Area: 0.213 ha (0.53 acres)
- Average elevation: 245
- Established: 06.04.1992
- Operator: Regional Council Stuttgart

Old Neckar (dt. Alter Neckar) is a nature conservation area designated by decree of the Regional Council Stuttgart on the territory of the municipality Altbach and the town Esslingen in the district of Esslingen in Baden-Württemberg. A 16.0-hectare (40-acre) area had already been placed under protection by decree of December 2, 1985.

The 21.3-hectare (53-acre) area is located at 245 m above sea level in the densely populated Middle Neckar Valley, directly south of built-up areas and industrial areas (Altbach/Deizisau combined heat and power plant Altbach) and is part of the natural areas of the Stuttgart Bight and the Filder.

The area includes an oxbow lake of the Neckar, the woods along the banks, adjacent meadows and fields, unused former fillings and rubble areas as well as parts of the banks of the Neckar Canal.

The Neckar's oxbow lake is a rare relic of earlier river history. It is also a breeding and habitat as well as a refuge for many endangered plant and animal species. The oxbow was created when the Neckar loop was punctured in 1933/34 during the course of the river's expansion and the Neckar Canal was dredged. With the excavation only a part of the former river course was filled up.

== Flora and Fauna ==
The fish richness of the oxbow lake with mud-pepper, chub, rudd, carp and another 15 species is attractive for grey heron, kingfisher and bittern. The reed beds on the banks are populated by woodlice, spiders and digger wasp, among others, and pike find their spawning grounds there. In the shady shore areas orioles and nightingales breed. In the narrow belt of hardwood and softwood floodplains there are still some relicts of the original floodplain forest. Deadwood is left on site and is used in many ways by insects. In the area 13 species of dragonflies have been recorded. Grass snakes, red-cheeked turtles, muskrats and hares have been sighted several times.

== See also ==
- List of nature reserves in the district of Esslingen
- List of protected landscape areas in the district of Esslingen
