= Altbach =

- Municipality
- Coat of arms

- Location of Altbach within Esslingen district
- Interactive map of Altbach
- Location within Germany Location within Baden-Württemberg
- Coordinates: 48°43′26″N 9°22′47″E
- Country: Germany
- State: Baden-Württemberg
- Admin. region: Stuttgart
- District: Esslingen

Government
  - Mayor (2017–25): Martin Funk

Area
  - Total: 3.34 km^{2} (1.29 sq mi)
- Elevation: 247 m (810 ft)

Population (2025-12-31)
  - Total: 6,084
  - Density: 1,820/km^{2} (4,720/sq mi)
- Time zone: UTC+01:00 (CET)
  - Summer (DST): UTC+02:00 (CEST)
- Postal codes: 73774–73776
- Dialling codes: 07153
- Vehicle registration: ES
- Website: www.altbach.de

Altbach (German pronunciation: [ˈaltbax]; Swabian: Albach) is a municipality in the district of Esslingen in Baden-Württemberg. It belongs to the Stuttgart Region. (until 1992 Region Mittlerer Neckar) and the European Metropolitan Region Stuttgart.

== Geography ==
=== Geographical location ===
Altbach lies on the southern slope of the Schurwald into the valley of the Neckar between Plochingen upstream and Esslingen am Neckar downstream. The old Neckar runs through the municipal area, which reaches to the right bank of the present course of the river, in an arc on the right bank, above which lie the residential areas crossed by the Altbach towards the Old arm, while on the flat river island between the runs there are mostly industrial areas of the Neckar valley.

The district is rich in springs, and so the community can cover 45% of its drinking water needs from its own wells.

=== Municipal division ===
No other places belong to the community of Altbach except the village of Altbach.

=== Neighbouring communities ===
Adjacent communities are in turn the cities Esslingen am Neckar in the west and north, Plochingen in the east and the community Deizisau in the south. All towns belong to the district of Esslingen.

=== Area distribution ===
According to data from Statistical State Office, status 2014.

== History ==
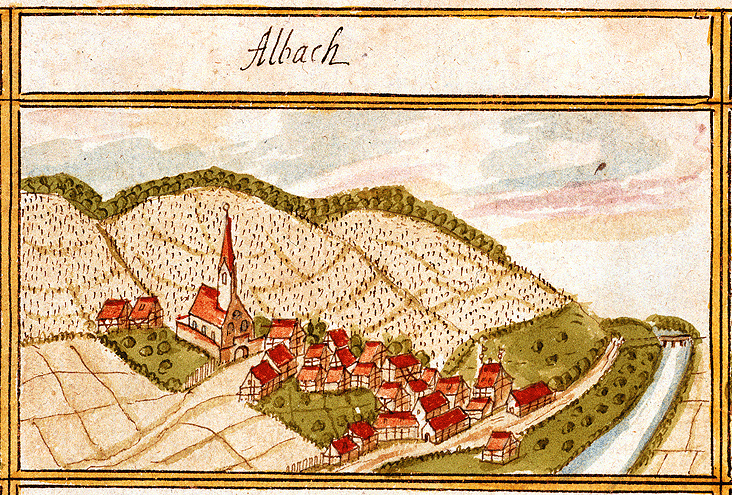
Altbach 1683/1685 in the Kieser forest camp book

=== Until the 19th century ===
Finds of row cemeteries and the early documentary mention indicate an early medieval foundation of the settlement. Altbach was first mentioned 783 in the Lorsch Codex. In the 13th century the Counts of Aichelberg acquired the village, but sold it piece by piece to the Kloster Adelberg. With the Reformation (1535), the state sovereignty arrived Württemberg, Altbach remained part of the Monastery Office Adelberg.. From 1806 Altbach belonged to the Oberamt Eßlingen in the Kingdom of Württemberg. In 1819 Altbach was separated from the neighbouring Zell, today a district of Esslingen, and has existed as an independent community since then. In 1846 Altbach was connected to the railway network of the Württemberg Railway with its own railway station, thus creating the conditions for the industrialisation.

=== From the 20th century ===
In 1904 Altbach was connected to the electricity grid, followed one year later by the construction of a water pipeline. Between 1922 and 1923 the parish separated ecclesiastically from its mother village Zell and had a parish vestry until 1931. During World War II about 10 to 12 houses were damaged and two civilians were killed. In 1984 Altbach celebrated its 1200th anniversary. From 1999 to 15 December 2000 the new development area Egertenäcker was built.

=== Population development ===
The population figures are census results (¹) or official updates of the Land Statistical Office (only main residences).

Stichtag	Einwohnerzahl
1. December 1871¹	572
1. December 1900¹	828
17. May 1939¹	1.662
13. September 1950¹	2.579
6. Juny 1961¹	4.168
27. May 1970¹	4.917
25. May 1987¹	5.559
31. December 1995	5.586
31. December 2000	5.551
31. December 2005	5.740
31. December 2010	5.840
31. December 2015	6.043

== Politics ==
=== City council ===
The municipal council in Altbach has 18 members. The municipal elections on 26 May 2019 led to the following final result. The local council consists of the elected honorary local councillors and the mayor as chairman. The mayor is entitled to vote in the municipal council.

Parties and electoral communities		% 2019	Seats; 2019	% 2014	Seats; 20149
FW	Unabhängige Wählervereinigung Altbach e.V.	40,60	7	39,13	7
CDU	Christlich Demokratische Union Deutschlands	29,12	5	32,19	6
SPD	Sozialdemokratische Partei Deutschlands	30,28	6	28,68	5
total		100,0	18	100,0	18
Voter participation		57,79 %		48,1 %	

=== Mayors ===
- 1819–1830: Johann Georg Reyer
- 1830–1857: Georg Friedrich Barth
- 1857–1889: Michael Frick
- 1890–1896: Johannes Hermann
- 1896–1901: Heinrich Utz
- 1901–1945: Louis Friedrich Raith
- 1945–1946: Albert Schloz
- 1946–1948: Willy Burgenmeister
- 1948–1966: Wilhelm Römer
- 1966–2001: Walter Stetter
- 2002–2017: Wolfgang Benignus
- since 1. January 2018: Martin Funk

In December 2017 the mayor of Ohmden, Martin Funk, was elected to succeed Wolfgang Benignus, who is retiring due to age. Funk received 38.08% of the votes in the second ballot.

=== Crest ===
Blazoning: in red an upwardly curved silver (white) diagonal bar

The coat of arms was originally held by the local nobility of Altbach. The flag colours are white-red. The coat of arms and flag colours were awarded to the municipality by the state government in 1954.

== Economy and Infrastructure ==
=== Traffic ===
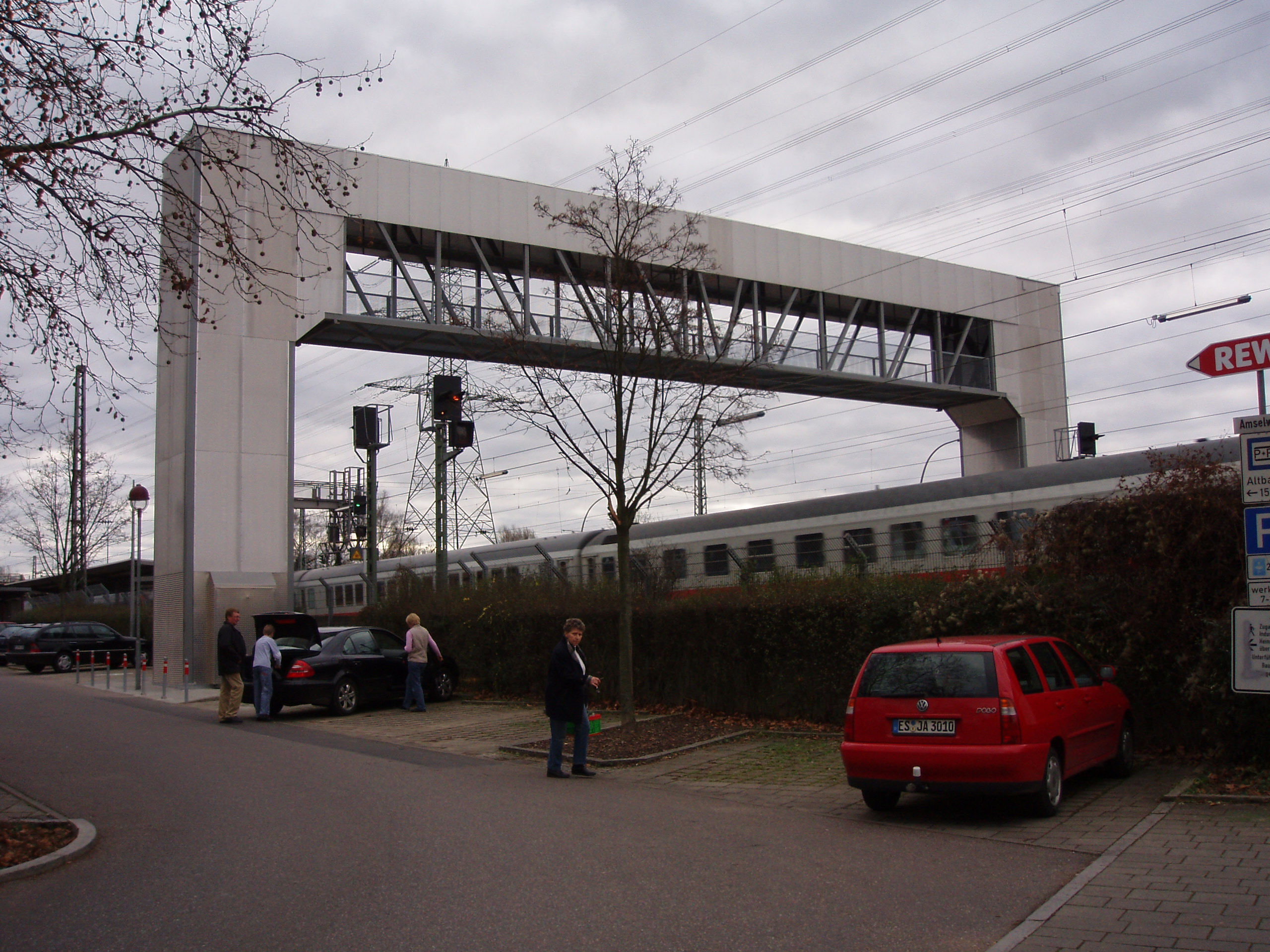
The People Mover

Altbach is connected to the B 10 (Stuttgart-Ulm) and in rail transport with the Filstalbahn and the S-Bahn line S1 to the VVS.

On December 19, 2006, the world's first people mover that crosses railway tracks was put into operation in Altbach.

=== Education ===
Altbach has a primary school, four kindergartens and a local library.

=== Altbach/Deizisau power station ===
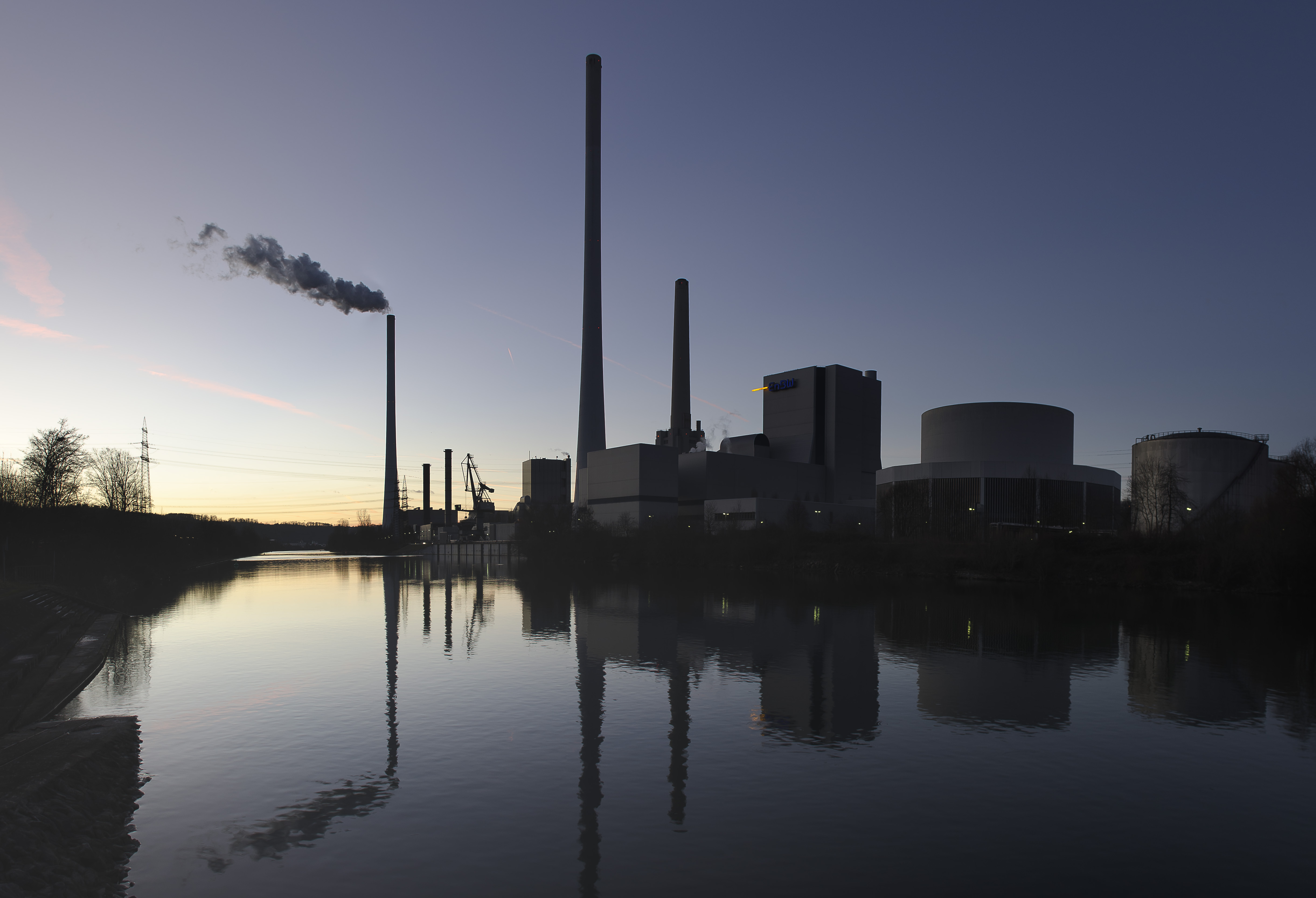
The power plant

The Altbach/Deizisau power plant is operated by EnBW and is considered one of the most modern German coal-fired power plants. It is located on an island in the Neckar river and half of it is in the neighbouring municipality of Deizisau, which is why the full name is also Kraftwerk Altbach/Deizisau. The two chimneys are higher than the Schurwaldhöhen and the Filder and therefore visible from afar.

Since 1899, the Neckar has been used for energy generation by one of the largest hydroelectric power plants in Württemberg at that time. The buildings were demolished in 1998 and converted into a park.

=== Waste disposal ===
The waste management company of the district of Esslingen is responsible for waste disposal. There are separate collections for organic waste, household waste and paper. Packaging is collected within the framework of the Green Dot in so-called Yellow Sacks. Bulky waste will be collected free of charge against submission of one of two vouchers per year or can be taken to a disposal station. Waste electrical and metal scrap and other recyclable materials can also be handed in at the disposal stations. For hazardous waste such as fluorescent lamps and paints there are special collections of problematic materials.

== Culture and sightseeing ==
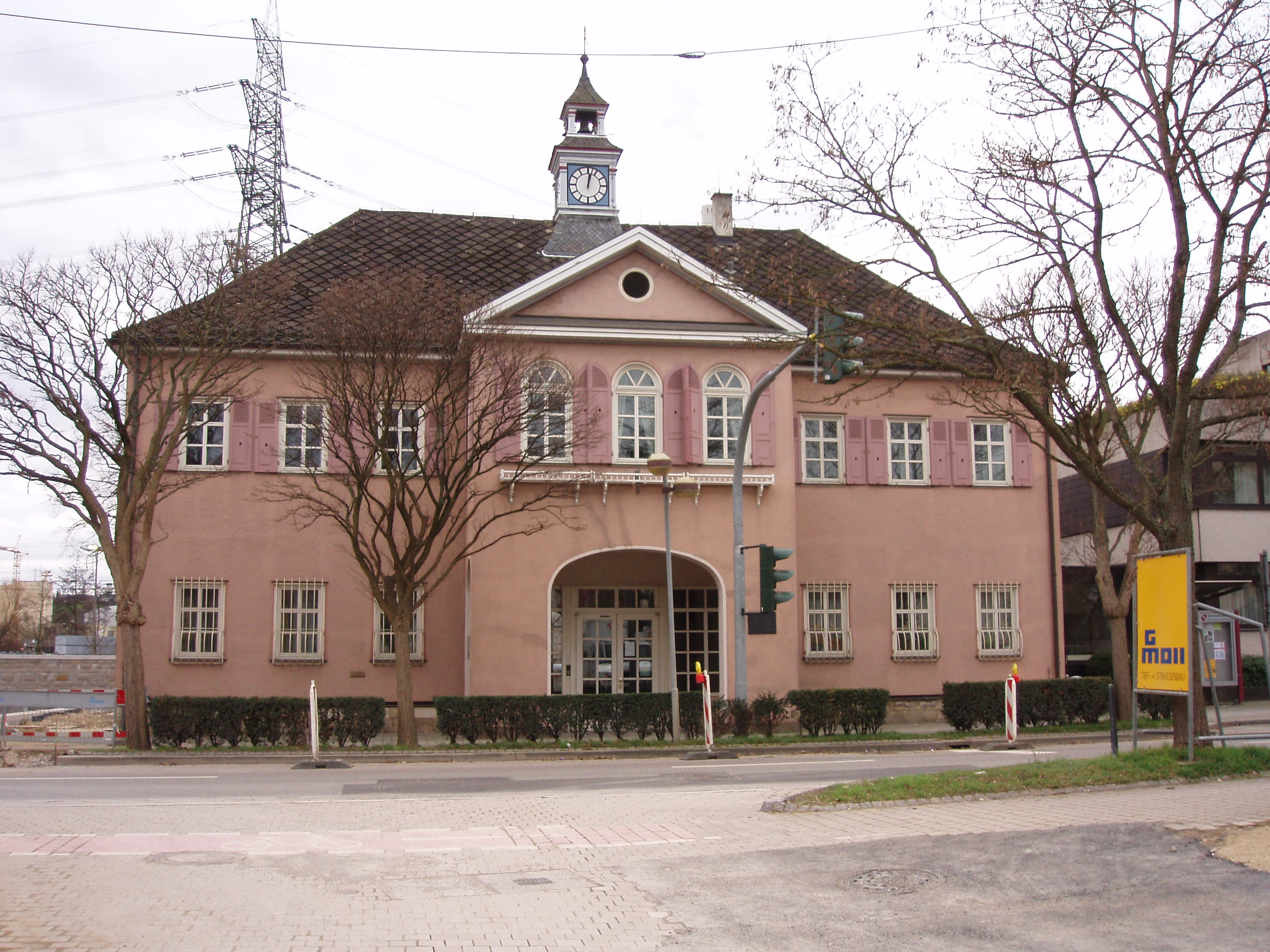

=== Community hall ===
Altbach has a community hall in which theatres, concerts, honours, festivals and other events of the Altbach cultural series are regularly held. The hall is not only made available to Altbach residents.

=== Old town hall ===
The Old Town Hall was originally a hunting lodge in the former game park of Hohengehren. The hunting lodge was acquired by Altbach in 1839, dismantled and rebuilt as a town hall in the same year.

=== Christ Church ===
The Christuskirche was built between 1959 and 1960 according to plans by Hans Seytter and was consecrated on 24 July 1960. The church was decorated with works of art by Helmuth Uhrig. The Christ figure on the wall, the baptismal font and the window of St. Michael are by his hand.

=== Ulrich Church ===
1353 an Ulrich chapel is documented in Altbach, it got its name from the patron saint Ulrich of the monastery Adelberg. In 1514, 1599 and 1748 it was extended and rebuilt, in 1736 it received a new tower. In 1817 a sacristy was added, in the 1920s the interior was thoroughly renovated twice; the church, located on the market place, was leased to the bourgeois community, underwent an interior and exterior renovation in 1978-1980 and now offers space for cultural purposes.

== Sports and recreation ==
In Altbach are over 20 clubs with a wide range of activities, including the gymnastics club, the cycling club, the sports club, the tennis club (together with Esslingen-Zell) and the table tennis club. The clubs work together to organise a varied children's holiday programme with the support of the municipality and the parishes.

== Settled companies ==
- Decoma (Germany) GmbH, a subsidiary of Magna Holding, produces plastic parts for the automotive industry

== Regular events ==
- The village festival takes place every year on the penultimate weekend before the summer holidays begin.
- The Christmas market takes place every year on the second Saturday in December.
- Every second year a night procession of the Altbach Fools takes place in Altbach.
- Every year, usually in May, the Altbacher Volksradfahren takes place, which is organized by the Altbach Cycling Club. The local clubs provide the participants.

== Notable residents ==
- Serdar Tasci, former footballer of VfB Stuttgart, playing for FC Bayern München since January 2016, started his career at SC Altbach
- Steffen Wagner, Olympic judo contestant, London, 2012; started his judo career at TV Altbach

== Literature ==
- Otto Wurster: Eßlinger Heimatbuch für Stadt und Umgebung. Eßlingen 1931. Darin: Altbach (S. 267 f.).
- Der Landkreis Esslingen – Hrsg. vom Landesarchiv Baden-Württemberg i. V. mit dem Landkreis Esslingen, Jan Thorbecke Verlag, Ostfildern 2009, ISBN 978-3-7995-0842-1, Band 1, Seiten 274–284.
