= Railway depot Plochingen =

Railway depor near Stuttgart

Coordinates: 48.717754°N 9.403643°E

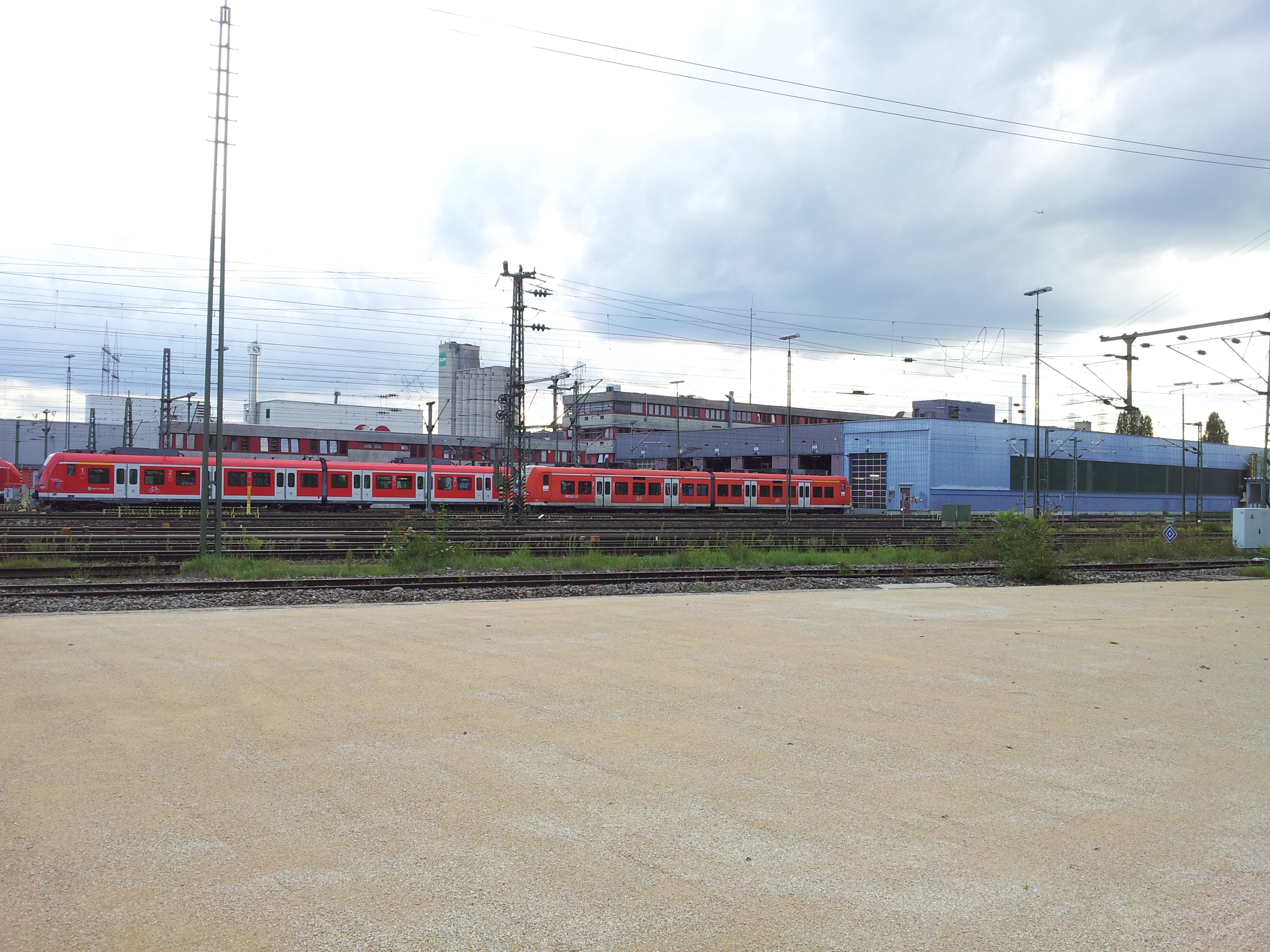
The depot

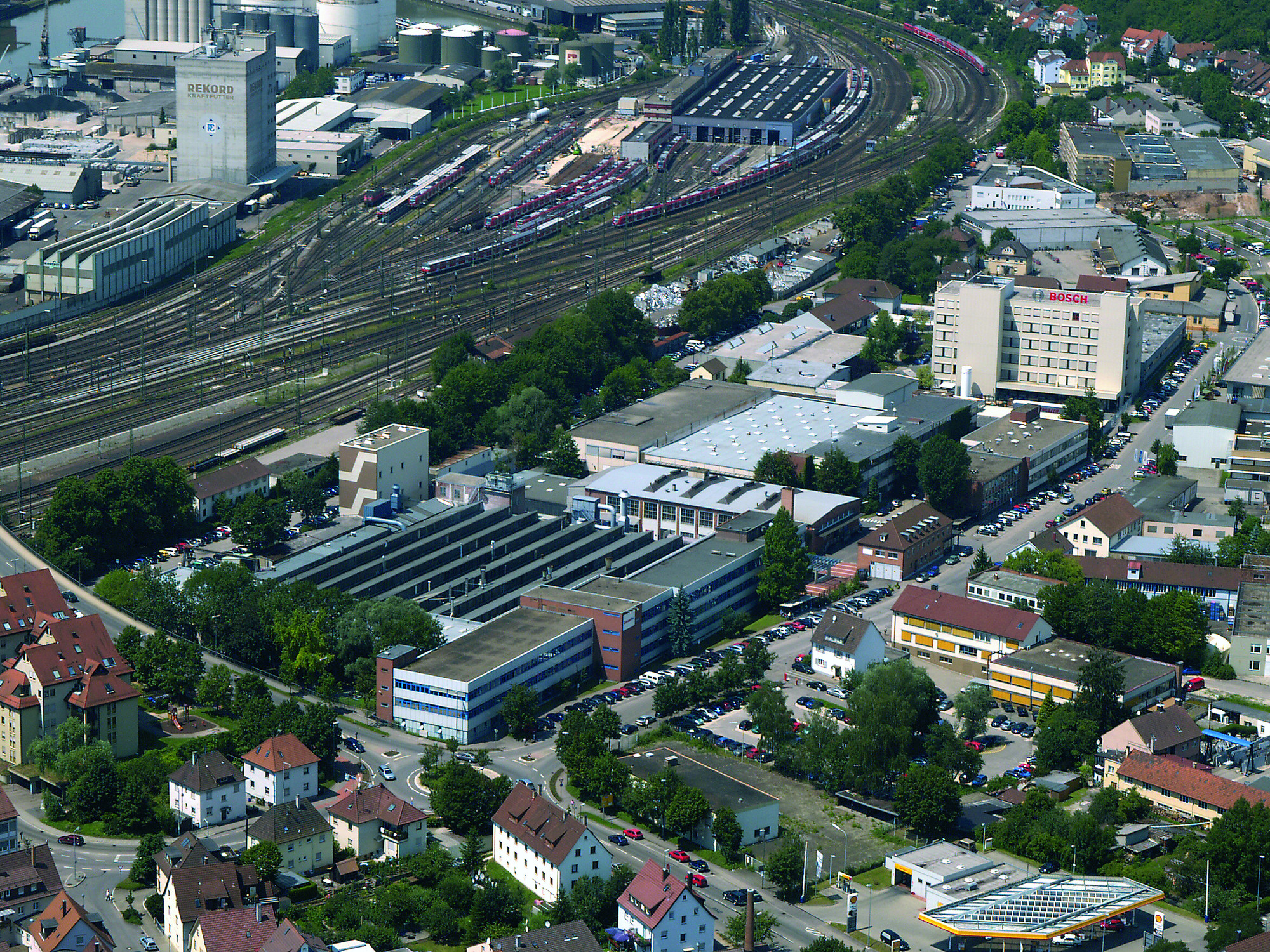
Aerial view, the depot is visible in the background

The Railway depot Plochingen (dt. Bahnbetriebswerk Plochingen) (short form: Bw Plochingen) is a depot of the DB Regio AG in Plochingen.

The depot is located west of the railway station next to the railway tracks leading to Stuttgart and can be reached from the road via the access road to the Neckarharbor. It is responsible for the maintenance of the Trains of the S-Bahn Stuttgart. Furthermore, it also looks after multiple units of the Regionalverkehr Württemberg. The current depot with the Stuttgart S-Bahn was opened in 1978, after the roundhouse of the old Plochingen depot had been located at about the same place.

== Equipment ==
The Plochingen train station has six tracks in the halls. All tracks are about 140 metres long. Five of the tracks are divided into two stands. On three tracks there are central pits for maintenance work. These tracks are elevated in order to be able to work on the vehicles better from the side. On two of the tracks there are two lifting systems each to lift complete multiple units by about 1.5 meters for axle replacement or maintenance work. In the middle of the track, which is not divided into stands, an underfloor wheel lathe is installed. It can be used to profile the wheels of the vehicles in the installed condition. Roof-mounted work platforms are installed on several tracks. Except for one stand, all tracks are spanned by overhead lines.

== Vehicles ==
- 60 units 423
- 1 unit 426
- 97 units 430
- 2 diesel locomotives 218
- 4 units 650

Until March 2006, ten units 425.1 were still stationed in Plochingen, but these were transferred to Ludwigshafen. In addition, until 2004 the fifth 426 was still stationed in Plochingen, the 426 011, which was lost in a serious accident at Süßen station on April 21, 2004. Four units ET 420.7 were delivered to Frankfurt in 2009. One unit ET 426 was added from Essen in 2010.
