= Grapple truck =

Truck equipped with a grapple loader, for loading and hauling bulky waste

Grapple Truck Example (Animation)

A grapple truck is a truck that has a grapple loader mounted to its frame which is used for loading and sometimes hauling bulky waste. Grapple trucks are commonly used by municipal sanitation or public works departments, and by waste collection companies. Grapple trucks can also sometimes be used in road construction and repair. There are six types of bulky waste collection system in which grapple trucks are used: loader and body systems, rear steer system, rolloff systems, rear mounted loader and haul truck systems, rear mounted loader and trailer systems, and transfer systems.

Grapple trucks are also referred to as knucklebooms. Most require only one operator, and are thus more cost-efficient than other trucks which require three or more people to load bulky waste.

== Grapple loaders ==
A grapple loader is defined by ANSI Z245.1 as:

“a hydro-mechanical device able to rotate on an axis with a grapple or bucket attached at the end of the boom, which is intended for the collection of waste that due to size and/or weight is impractical to containerize.”

== Loader and body system ==
Loader and body system

A grapple truck can sometimes be configured to include a dump body. A single operator loads, hauls, and dumps the load.

== Rear steer system ==
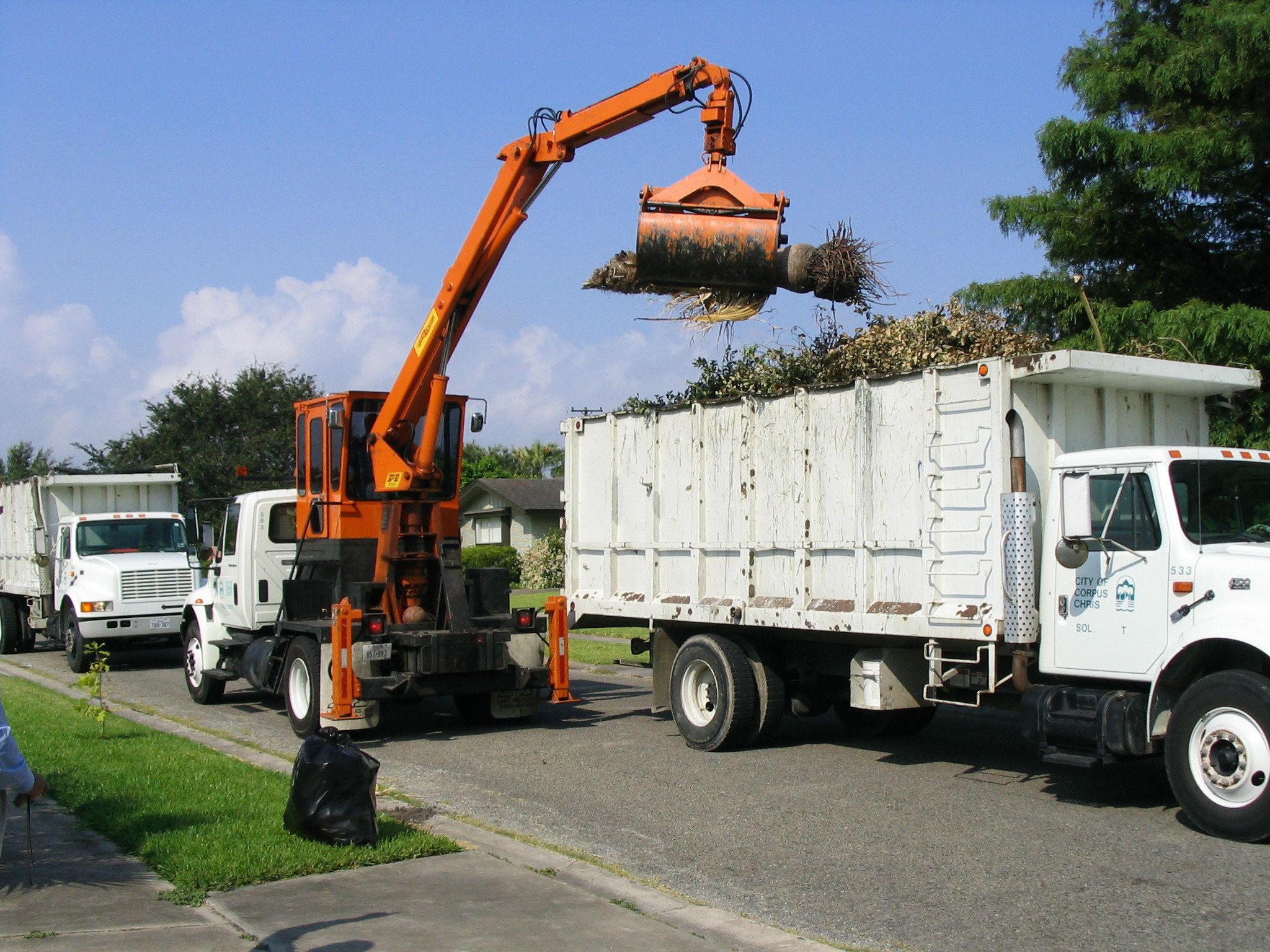
Rear steer system

With this system, a grapple loader is mounted on the rear of a short frame chassis with an operator's cab mounted between loader and chassis cab. The loader is operated from this cab, and all driving controls are also routed to the operator's cab enabling the "rear steer" unit to drive backwards along the route and load into separate haul trucks.

== Rolloff system ==
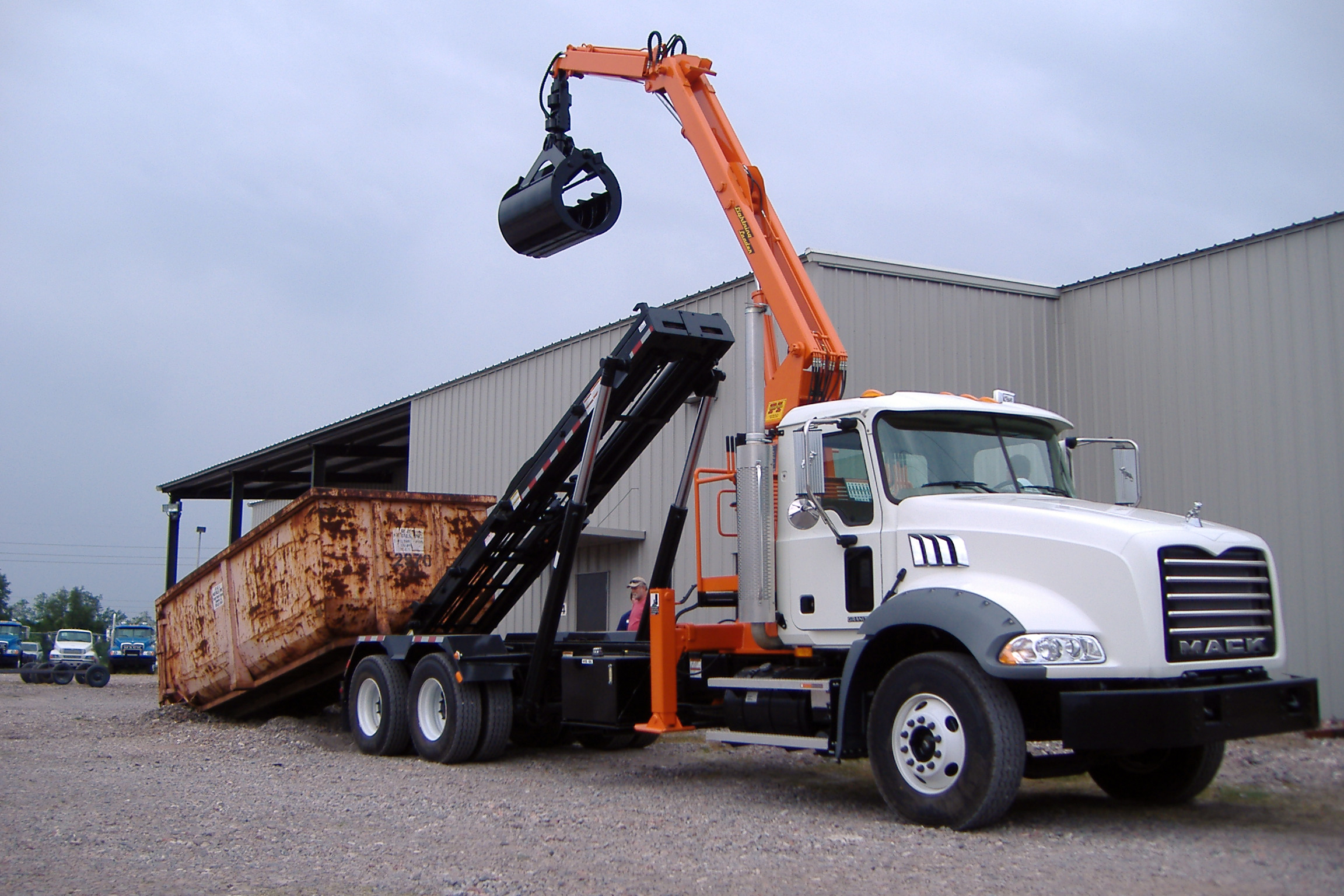
Roll off system

A grapple loader is mounted behind a truck cab. A cable roll off is mounted behind the grapple. The grapple loads in to roll off boxes. When the box is full it is dropped at a staging area and an empty box is rolled on. Boxes are transported between staging area and landfill by a shuttle truck.

== Rear mounted loader and haul truck system ==
Rear loader and truck system

A grapple loader is mounted on the rear of a short frame chassis. The grapple truck loads into separate haul trucks which travel back and forth between loading unit and landfill.

== Rear mounted loader and trailer system ==
Rear loader and trailer system

The grapple loader is mounted on rear of a short frame chassis, with a trailer hauled behind. The trailer is loaded, then when it is full it is exchanged for an empty one. An additional truck is used to shuttle trailers between the landfill and loading vehicle.

== Transfer system ==
The grapple loading mechanism is mounted with a dump truck body on a truck chassis. The grapple truck loads into the dump truck body or into separate haul trucks. When the dump truck body is full, the trash is transferred into another haul vehicle.
