= Altbach Power Station =

Coal power plant in Germany

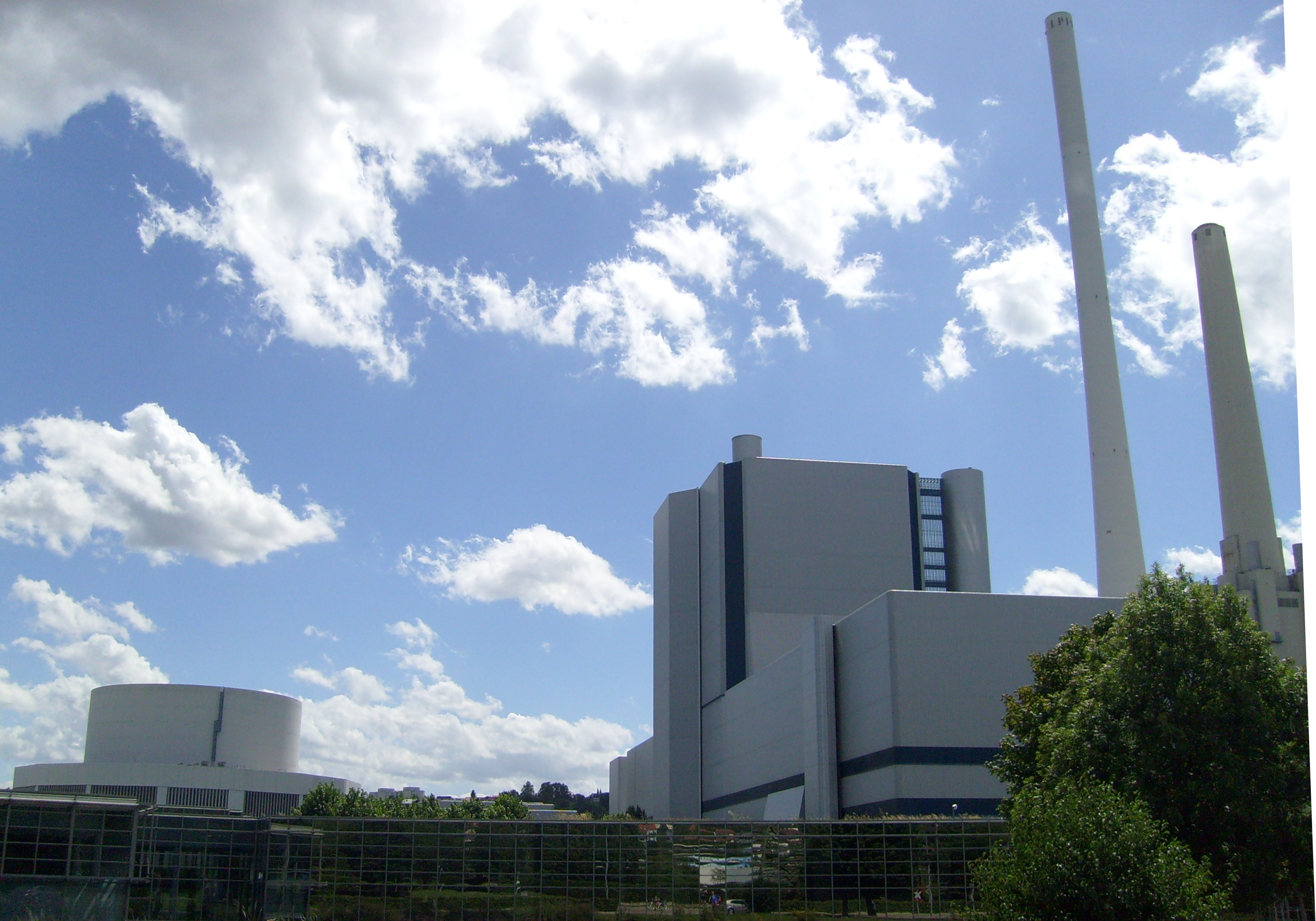
- Unit 2 of the Altbach Power Plant
- Country: Germany
- Location: Altbach
- Coordinates: 48°43′03″N 9°22′30″E
- Status: Operational
- Commission date: 1950
- Owner: EnBW
- Operator: EnBW

Thermal power station
- Primary fuel: Bituminous Coal

Power generation
- Nameplate capacity: 1,036 MW

External links
- Commons: Related media on Commons

Altbach Power Station is a coal-fired power plant owned and operated by EnBW at Altbach, Baden-Württemberg, Germany. It has an output capacity of 1,036 MWe, 783MW being coal fired divided amongst two 420-30MW units and 253MW of gas fired capacity divided amongst four units ranging from 53-85MW. The power station is also connected to the Mittlerer Neckar district heating system.

The first power plant on the Altbach site was built in 1899. The precursors of the current power plant went into service in 1950 (unit 1) and in 1956 and 1958 (units 2 and 3). Unit 1 was shut down in 1982 and demolished in 1985. Units 2 and 3 were shut down and demolished in 1993.

Unit 1 was replaced by a new unit in 1985 and units 2 and 3 by a new unit in 1997. Both units have 250-metre-tall (820 ft) chimneys.

Unit 1 from 1985 received architectural landmark status in November 2021. Like the visitor center and the new Unit 2, it is the work of the German Architect Gerhard Feuser of the group Angerer & Feuser.

The power station also features a forced draft cooling tower which is used to cool the remaining water not used in the heating system.
