= Park railway in the Neckarauen =

Miniature rideable railway in Germany

Coordinates: 48.705066°N 9.418543°E

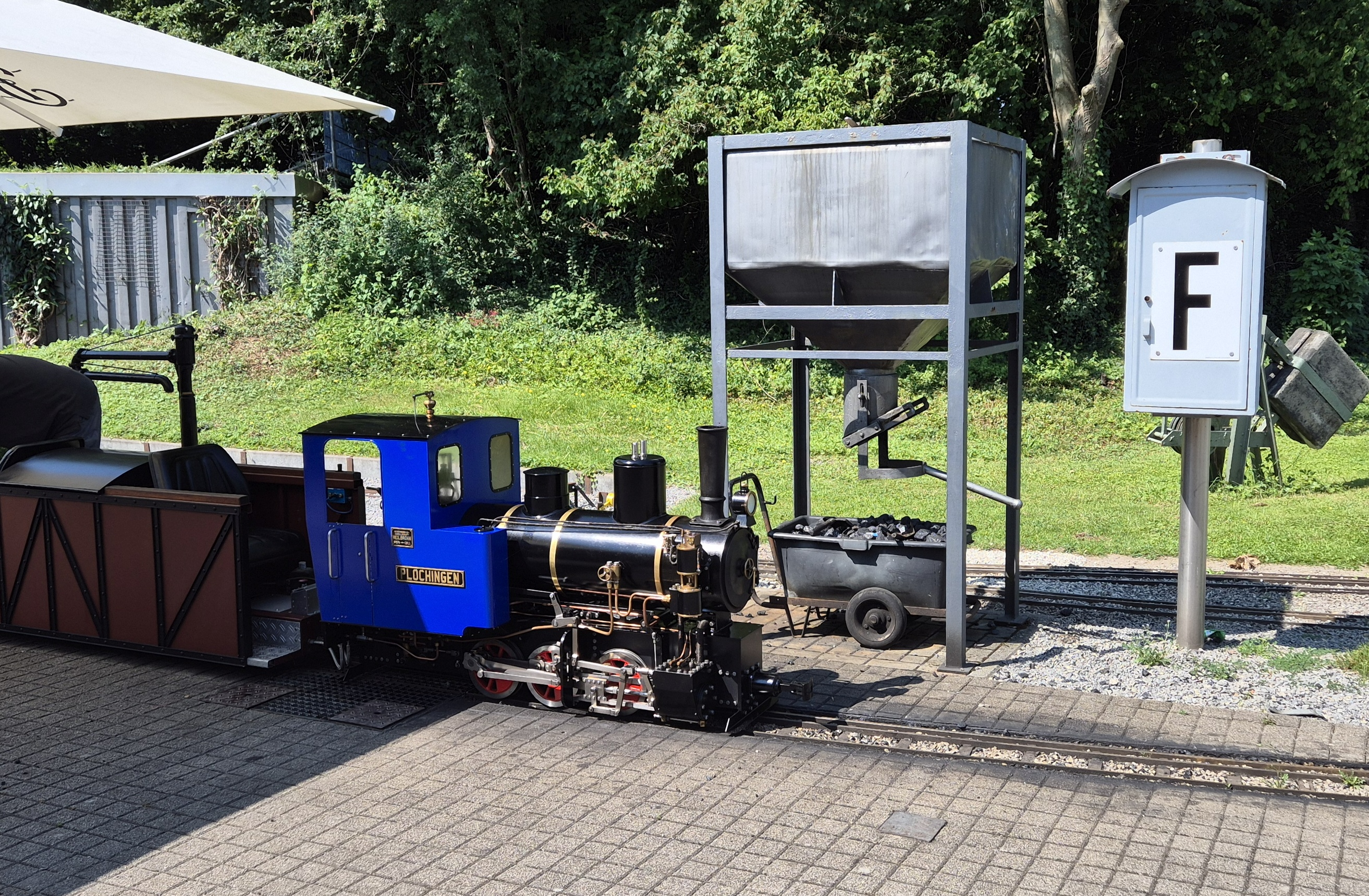
Parkbahn in den Neckarauen

The Park railway in the Neckarauen (dt. Parkbahn in den Neckarauen) is a ridable miniature railway operated by the Club Dampfbahner Plochingen with 127 mm (5 inches) and 184 mm (7.25 inches) gauges, which was built in 1998 on the Neckarauen, the place where the Landesgartenschau Baden-Württemberg took place at that time.

The track is 1.5 kilometers long in total, of which 1.2 kilometers are regularly used. The travel time is about 10 minutes. In contrast to most other park railways, which only have a simple track oval, the park railway in the Neckarauen region has several interlocking circuits.

The operating association Dampfbahner Plochingen e.V., founded in 1980, owns eight steam locomotives, of which the 1:3 scale and the locomotive Plochingen, a replica of the locomotive of the "Heilbronn" type, regularly pull the visitor trains, which run every weekend from Easter Monday to October.
