= CeramTec =

Ceramics company

CeramTec GmbH
- Company type: Public Company
- Industry: Advanced Ceramics, Technical Ceramics
- Founded: 1996 / 1903
- Headquarters: Plochingen (Headquarters), Germany
- Area served: Worldwide
- Key people: Dr Carla Kriwet (CEO and President Medical), Eric Oellerer (CFO), Horst Garbrecht (President Industrial)
- Services: Ceramic Engineering
- Revenue: EUR 685 million (2025)
- Number of employees: 3,500 (2025)
- Parent: BC Partners
- Website: ceramtec-group.com

The CeramTec Group is a developer and manufacturer of products and components made of technical ceramics (also known as advanced technical ceramics). The products are marketed through its own sales companies, among others. They are primarily used in medical technology, automotive engineering, electronics, equipment and mechanical engineering, environmental and energy technology, toolmaking, the chemical industry and the semiconductor industry. The company is headquartered in Plochingen in Baden-Württemberg, Germany.

The company is present around the globe and has production sites and sales offices in the world’s most important markets. In Germany, the main sites are Plochingen, Lauf and Marktredwitz in addition to the company’s other German sites in Ebersbach, Lohmar and Wilhermsdorf.

The company is a member of the Ceramic Industry Association (German: Verband der Keramischen Industrie e.V. - VKI) and the German Ceramic Society.

== History ==
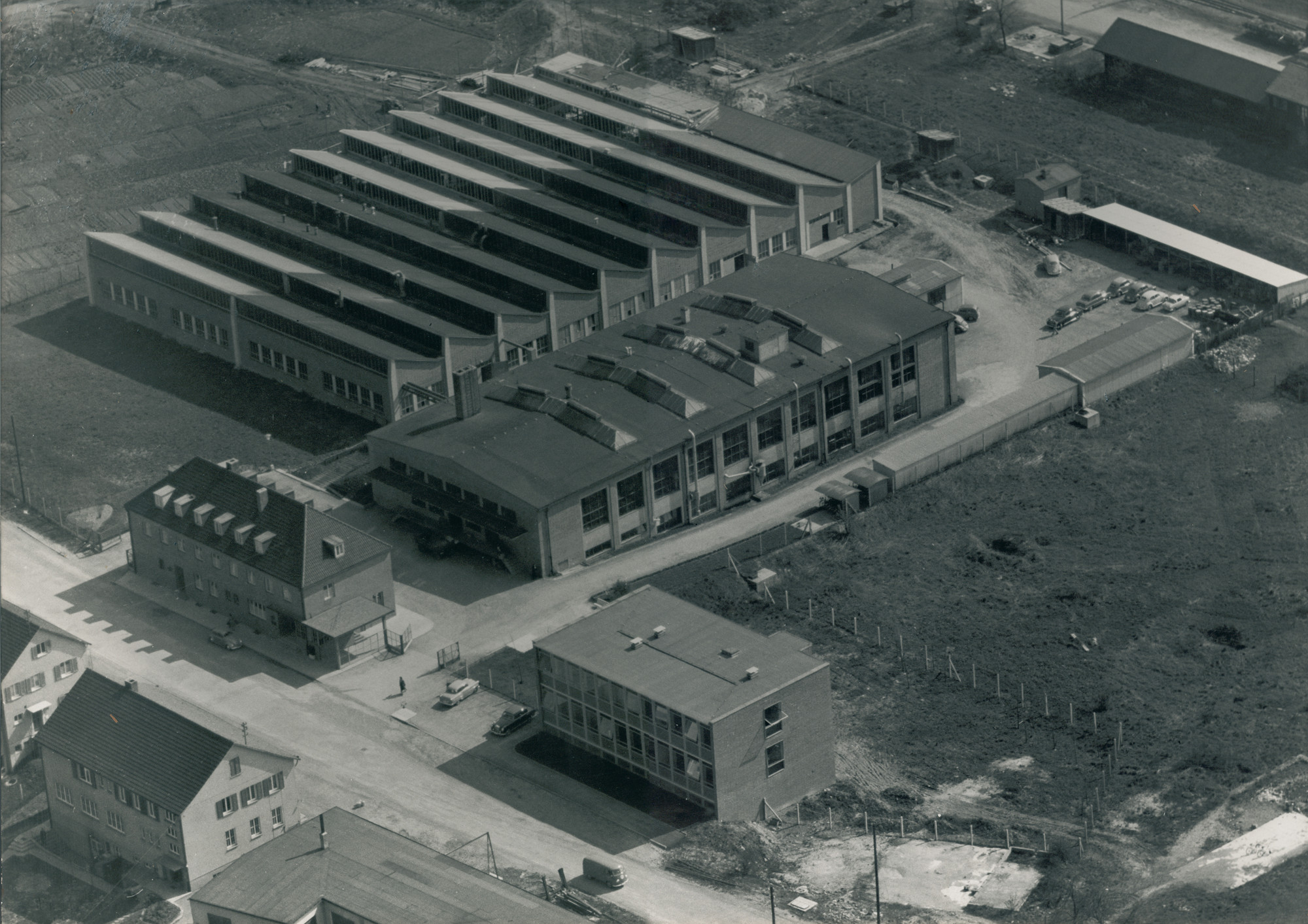
The Plochingen site in 1959

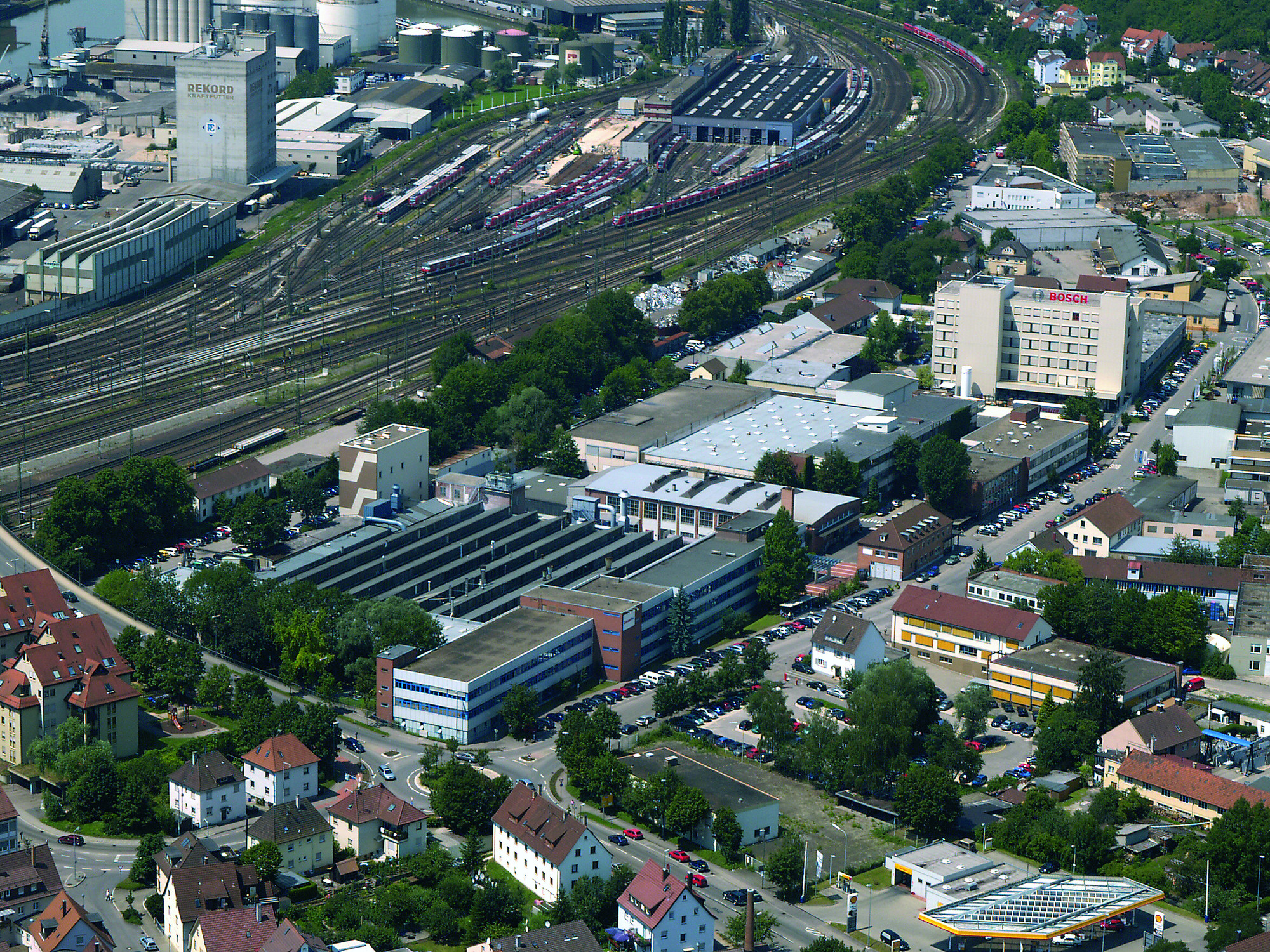
The Plochingen site in 2005

The founding of CeramTec goes back to the year 1903, when the Thomas factories (Thomaswerke) were founded at the Marktredwitz site, and which were taken over by Philipp Rosenthal & Co. AG in 1908. In 1921 Philipp Rosenthal & Co. AG began cooperating with AEG in the development of technical porcelain for early industrial applications of ceramic materials. The two companies intensified this partnership in the area of technical ceramics in 1936, resulting in the foundation of Rosenthal Isolatoren GmbH, also known as RIG.

With the intention of manufacturing technical ceramics, they reorganized their cooperation in 1971. The result was the company Rosenthal Stemag Technische Keramik GmbH, which was renamed Rosenthal Technik AG in 1974. In 1985 Hoechst AG acquired the company and from that point on operated it under the name Hoechst CeramTec AG. Cerasiv GmbH, a company based in Plochingen, took over Hoechst CeramTec AG in 1996 and the newly formed company received the name CeramTec AG.

The site in Lauf an der Pegnitz has its roots in STEMAG AG (Steatit-Magnesia Aktiengesellschaft), founded in 1921. Following an initial incorporation into AEG in 1970, the company merged into Rosenthal Stemag Technische Keramik GmbH in 1971 as part of the reorganization of the partnership between Rosenthal and AEG.

Südplastik Gummi- und Kunststoffverarbeitung GmbH began operations at the Plochingen site in 1951. Feldmühle AG took over the company in 1953, renaming it Südplastik und -keramik GmbH (SPK). Feldmühle AG refocused its ceramic activities in 1991 in the newly founded Cerasiv GmbH, but then quickly sold it in 1992 to Metallgesellschaft AG, which integrated the company into its subsidiary Dynamit Nobel AG. Cerasiv GmbH’s acquisition of Hoechst CeramTec AG followed in 1996, resulting in the founding of CeramTec AG as a Metallgesellschaft AG (mg technologies AG) company.

Metallgesellschaft AG’s subgroup Dynamit Nobel AG broke away from Metallgesellschaft AG in 2004. KKR, an American private equity firm, became the main buyer, integrating parts of Dynamit Nobel AG into Rockwood Holdings Inc. In the process, the US-based Rockwood group took over ownership of the CeramTec AG group. CeramTec continued to grow, acquiring and integrating Emil Müller GmbH (Wilhermsdorf, Germany) into the company as a subsidiary in 2007. A further acquisition followed in 2008; ETEC Gesellschaft für technische Keramik mbH also became a subsidiary and was renamed CeramTec-ETEC GmbH.

In 2013, Rockwood divested several of its companies and the CeramTec group was acquired by the British private equity firm Cinven.

In 2017, CeramTec acquired Morgan UK ElectroCeramics with its two sites in Southampton and Ruabon to complement its existing product portfolio in the field of sensors, capacitors, transducers and piezo ceramics.

In 2017, Cinven sold the CeramTec group of companies to funds advised by private equity investor BC Partners and other co-investors for a purchase price of EUR 2.6 billion.

In spring 2021, the CeramTec Group acquired the Swiss specialist for ceramic dental implants, Dentalpoint AG (today CeramTec Schweiz GmbH). In 2022, the Canada Pension Plan Investment Board (CPPIB) and the BC XI fund advised by BC Partners and co-investors each acquired 50% of the CeramTec Group.

In September 2023, the official ground-breaking ceremony for a new building to expand production capacity in the medical technology sector took place at CeramTec’s Marktredwitz site.

== Applications and products ==
The areas of application for the products, components and solutions cover a range of different markets. A selection of the most important applications:

=== Medical technology ===
- Orthopaedics: Ceramic components for artificial hip and knee joints
- Dental medicine: Bioceramic dental implants
- Veterinary ceramic solutions
- Medical devices: sensors, ultrasonic applications and structural ceramic components
- Dipping moulds for glove production

=== Automotive & Electronics ===
- Substrates: Ceramic substrates can be used to manufacture numerous key components for electronic applications.
- Piezoceramic sensors: These can increase occupant safety and enable intelligent engine control.
- Heat sinks: From thermal management in inverters and converters for hybrid and electric vehicles to insulation ceramics for high-voltage PTC heating modules.
- Slide, bearing and sealing technology: Improving performance and service life in the automotive industry.
- Passive components: coilformers, resistor carriers and fuses for electronic circuits.

=== Chemical industry ===
- Catalyst carriers: Ceramic carrier materials in heterogeneous catalysis
- Grinding granulates, grinding balls and feedstones
- Porous products: Resistance in electrochemical processes and electroplating
- Tubes & special components

=== Semiconductor industry ===
- Silicon carbide wafer chucks and other ceramic components with advanced properties

=== Industrial applications ===
- 3D printing with aluminium oxide or silicon carbide: design freedom, time and cost savings
- Ceramic tools for the welding process
- Pumps, valves and seals
- Salt cores: Residue-free cavities in cast components
- Sanitary technology: cartridges, sealing and control discs
- Silicate ceramics: heating, thermal and insulation technology
- Textile industry: Friction discs, thread guides and technical cutting edges
- Ultrasonic technology for measurement and sensor applications
- Forming technology: wire drawing, tube processing and forming systems

=== Machining technology ===
- Indexable inserts made of ceramic cutting materials, polycrystalline cubic boron nitride (PcBN) and cermets for metal cutting
- Cutting materials, tool systems and tool carrier systems for turning, hard turning, grooving, milling or boring

== Main materials ==
=== Oxide ceramics ===
- Aluminium oxide
- Zirconium oxide
- Mixed / Dispersion Ceramics
- Aluminium titanate
- Silicate ceramic
- Piezoceramic

=== Non-oxide ceramics ===
- Silicon carbide (ROCAR, 3D-printing)
- Silicon nitride
- Aluminum nitride (Alunit)
- SiAIONs
- PcBN Polycrystalline cubic boron nitride

=== Composite materials ===
- Metal Matrix Composite (MMC)

=== Salt cores ===
- Bonded
- Sintered
- Core shells
