= Plochingen =

- Town
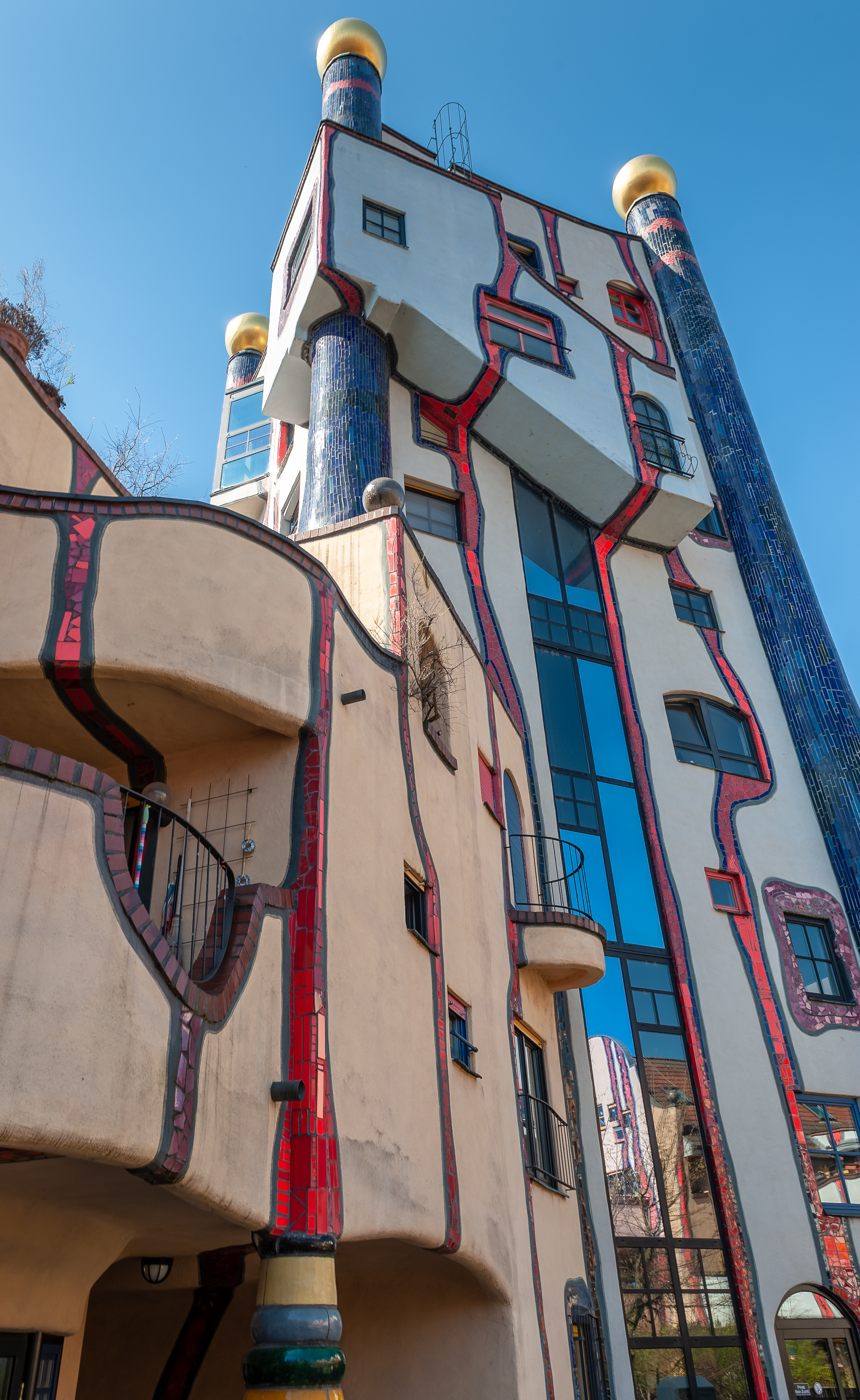
- Hundertwasser house

- Coat of arms

- Location of Plochingen within Esslingen district
- Interactive map of Plochingen
- Location within Germany Location within Baden-Württemberg
- Coordinates: 48°42′42″N 9°24′59″E
- Country: Germany
- State: Baden-Württemberg
- Admin. region: Stuttgart
- District: Esslingen

Government
  - Mayor (2024–32): Frank Buß

Area
  - Total: 10.64 km^{2} (4.11 sq mi)
- Elevation: 276 m (906 ft)

Population (2025-12-31)
  - Total: 14,503
  - Density: 1,363/km^{2} (3,530/sq mi)
- Time zone: UTC+01:00 (CET)
  - Summer (DST): UTC+02:00 (CEST)
- Postal codes: 73201–73207
- Dialling codes: 07153
- Vehicle registration: ES
- Website: www.plochingen.de

Plochingen (German pronunciation: [ˈplɔxɪŋən]; Swabian: Blocheng or Blochenga) is a town in the district of Esslingen in Baden-Württemberg in southern Germany. It lies on the river Neckar, on which it has a river port. With about 14,000 inhabitants, it is part of the Stuttgart Metropolitan Region.

== Geography ==
=== Geographical location ===
Plochingen is about 9 kilometres (5.6 mi) east-southeast of the district town Esslingen am Neckar and in the same direction about 19 kilometres (12 mi) from the state capital Stuttgart. The town is situated on the right banks of the Fils and the outflowing Neckar. In the area of the town, three Natural areas collide, the Foreland of the central Swabian Alb in the southeast, the subspace Schurwald of the natural area Schurwald and Welzheimer Wald in the northeast, and the subspace Nürtinger-Esslinger Neckartal, which is part of the Filder, along the larger of the two rivers in the west. The lowest point in the town area is in the very west at the outflow of the Neckar at 247 metres (810 ft) above sea level, the highest point is in the very north at the White Stone on the Schurwaldkamm at about 448 metres (1,470 ft) above sea level, from which forest areas cover a large part of the town area.

=== Neighboring villages/towns ===
Neighbouring towns are in turn the community Altbach in the west, the district town Esslingen am Neckar in the northwest, the community Baltmannsweiler in the northeast and the community Reichenbach an der Fils in the east, in the southeast briefly the municipality Hochdorf, in the south the town Wernau (Neckar), in the southwest the municipality Deizisau, all of which also belong to the district of Esslingen.

=== Urban planning ===
Plochingen includes the town of Plochingen and the district of Stumpenhof to the north-east of the town.

=== Land usage ===
According to data from the Statistical State Office Baden-Württemberg, status 2014.

== History ==
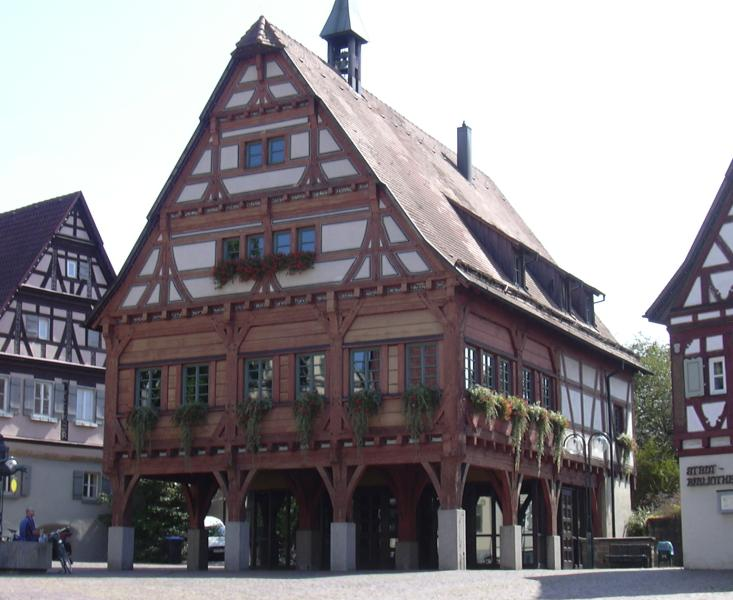
Old town hall

=== Ancient ===
Due to its convenient location at the mouth of the Fils into the Neckar, people have been living in the area since the earliest times, which is attested by finds from the Stone Age. Finds of weapons and grave goods from the Bronze Age give evidence of a settlement belonging to the Urnfield culture. Also from the Hallstatt period grave mounds indicate that there might have been a continuous Celtic settlement up to the Roman period. In classical antiquity the Romans and in the early Middle Ages the Alamanni settled in the area.

=== From the middle ages to the 19th century ===
In the High Middle Ages, Plochingen was situated in the territory of the Herzogtum Schwaben and formed part of the Neckargau. The place was first mentioned in 1146 as Blochingen in a document of the king Conrad III of Hohenstaufen. There were two castles in Plochingen, but nothing remains of them. From the 12th to the 14th century the seat of a noble family can be proven for Plochingen. In 1331, the lord of the castle Johann von Plochingen sold some property in Plochingen to the hospital in Esslingen. The Württemberg part of Plochingen, originally with the bailiwick of Nellingen, was already subordinated to the office in Stuttgart at the beginning of the 15th century. Since the 12th century Plochingen had had a market for building materials, salt and agricultural goods, including in particular wine, grain, fishing and livestock. In 1536 Duke Ulrich von Württemberg pushed through the Reformation. In 1545 the first bridge over the Neckar was built, replacing a medieval footbridge. In addition, a bridge over the Fils was built, so that bridge tolls could be charged for it. After the Battle of Nördlingen lost for Württemberg, Plochingen's convenient location had a negative effect on the traffic situation during the Thirty Years' War, as imperial troops plundered the town as early as 1634 and many houses burned down. The population of about 1300 people before the war sank to about 500 inhabitants after the war. In 1698 Plochingen became a post station on the imperial postal line between Antwerp and Venice, operated by the House of Thurn- und Taxis. In 1778 the Hofwerkmeister Johann Christian Adam Etzel (1743-1801; uncle of Gottlieb Christian Eberhard von Etzel) built the covered wooden bridge with a self-supporting span of 70 metres without intermediate pillars across the Neckar, which then became famous in Europe, 1905 it was replaced by the extension of the railway station completely intact. In 1808, the municipality moved from the Amtsoberamt Stuttgart to the newly established Oberamt Esslingen in implementing the new administrative division of Württemberg in the Kingdom of Württemberg. In 1846, the construction of the Filstalbahn as far as Plochingen led to the connection to the emerging network of the Württembergische Staatsbahnen, only one year after a train had run for the first time in Württemberg on the line between Cannstatt and Untertürkheim. In 1888 the Schwäbische Albverein was founded in the Waldhorn Restaurant.

=== 20th century ===
In 1905 the wooden bridge from 1778 was replaced by an iron bridge over the Neckar. On 1 June 1913 a tornado destroyed numerous buildings in Plochingen. During the district reform during NS period in Württemberg Plochingen came to the district of Esslingen in 1938. After the Second World War, the community fell into the American occupation zone and was located in the state Württemberg-Baden from 1945 to 1952. On April 13, 1948, the municipality of Plochingen was elevated to the status of a town, which became part of the new federal state of Baden-Württemberg in 1952. On 12 July 1968 the Neckarhafen Plochingen was inaugurated. Since the beginning of the S-Bahn operation in the Stuttgart area on October 1, 1978, the vehicles have been technically maintained and cleaned in the Bahnbetriebswerk Plochingen.

In 1998, Plochingen hosted the Landesgartenschau Baden-Württemberg.

=== Religion ===
Since the Reformation Plochingen has been evangelical shaped. There is also a Roman Catholic church. In recent years, an Evangelical Methodist and a New Apostolic Church have also been established.

=== Population development ===
The population figures are estimates, or official updates of the Statistical Office.

Day	Population
1618	1,320
1635	250
1 December 1871	1,881
1 December 1900	2,413
17 May 1939	5,446
13 September 1950	8,148
6 July 1961	11,358
27 May 1970	12,953
25 May 1987	12,140
31 December 1995	13,085
31 December 2000	14,191
31 December 2005	14,319
31 December 2010	14,209
31 December 2015	13,997
31 December 2016	14,086
31 December 2017	14,213
31 December 2018	14,433

== Politics ==
=== Administrative association ===
Plochingen forms with Altbach and Deizisau the Gemeindeverwaltungsverband Plochingen. Frank Buß, the mayor of the town of Plochingen, is the chairman of the administrative association.

The town of Plochingen also runs its own businesses. These are the Stadtwerke (Public utilities), the Eigenbetrieb Abwasserbeseitigung (Own operation sewage disposal) and the Eigenbetrieb Wohnen (Owner-occupied living).

=== Mayors ===
- 1946–1947: Gerhard Kühlkopf
- 1947–1951: August Schöck
- 1951–1969: Emil Hartung
- 1969–2008: Eugen Beck
- since 2008: Frank Buß (* 1964)

=== Town council ===
The municipal council in Plochingen has 22 members. The local elections in Baden-Württemberg 2019 led to the following official final result. The local council consists of the elected honorary local councillors and the mayor as chairman. The mayor is entitled to vote in the municipal council.

Parties and electoral communities		% 2019	Seats; 2019	% 2014	Seats; 2014
CDU-WG	Christlich Demokratische Union Deutschlands–Wahlgemeinschaft	31.64	7	30.75	7
SPD	Sozialdemokratische Partei Deutschlands	26.79	6	29.78	7
OGL	Offene Grüne Liste Plochingen e.V.	22.39	5	19.06	4
ULP	Unabhängige Liste Plochingen	19.19	4	0	--
FW	Freie Wähler Plochingen e.V.	0	--	20.41	4
gesamt		100.0	22	100.0	22
Wahlbeteiligung		55.64 %		47.01 %	

=== Crest ===
The town coat of arms is five times diagonally left divided by blue and gold. The town colours are blue and yellow.

== Economy and infrastructure ==
- Neckar harbour with the settlement of around 20 companies and an annual turnover of around 1,400,000 tonnes.
- For some years now, wine has been grown again in Plochingen. The Plochingen sites belong to the large Weinsteige site in the Remstal-Stuttgart area.

=== Traffic ===
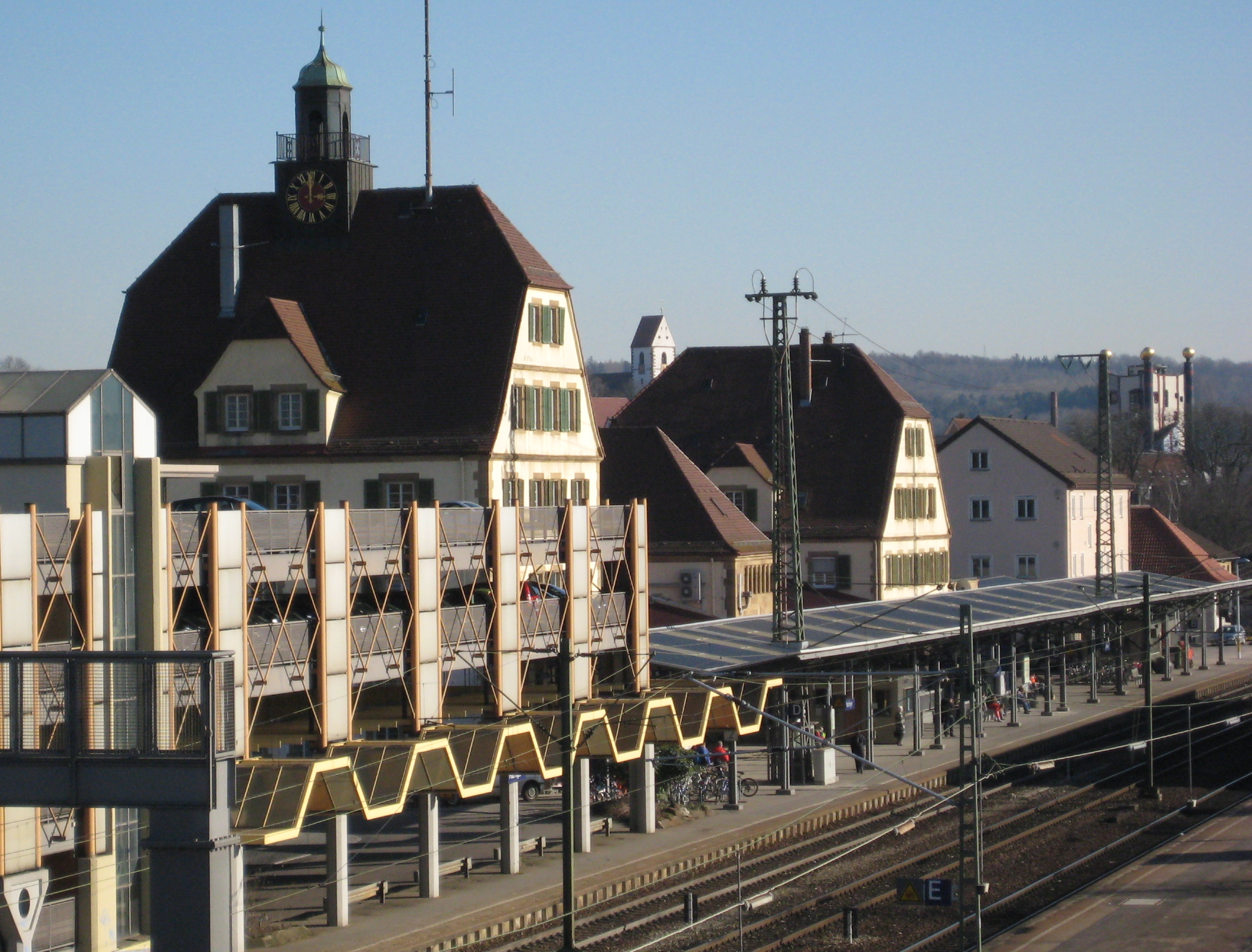
Plochingen railway station

The town can be reached by car via Bundesstraße 10 from Stuttgart in about 25 minutes. At the Plochinger Dreieck the B 313 branches off, direction Tübingen and Stockach from the B 10 In addition to this motorway-like structure, two further road bridges and a pedestrian bridge span the Neckar near Plochingen.

The Plochingen station is a traffic junction of the Deutsche Bahn at the Neckar-Alb-Bahn (Stuttgart-Tübingen-Horb am Neckar) and the Filstalbahn (Stuttgart-Ulm-Munich). It is served by long-distance trains, regional trains and the S1 line of the S-Bahn Stuttgart. The maintenance of the railcars of the S-Bahn Stuttgart takes place in the Depot Plochingen.

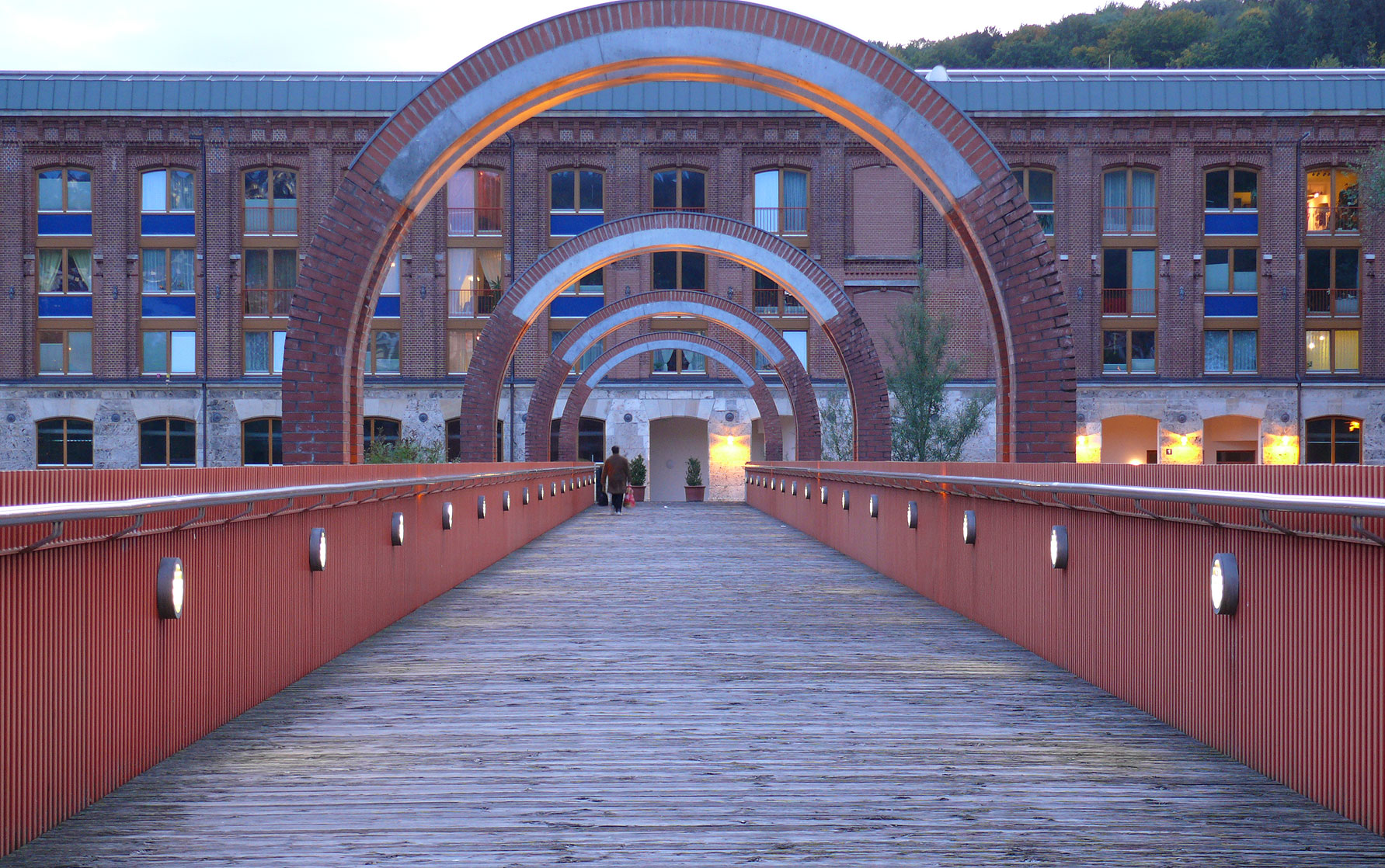
Pedestrian bridge over the Neckar to the residential and recreation area Bruckenwasen (the site of the State Garden Show 1998)

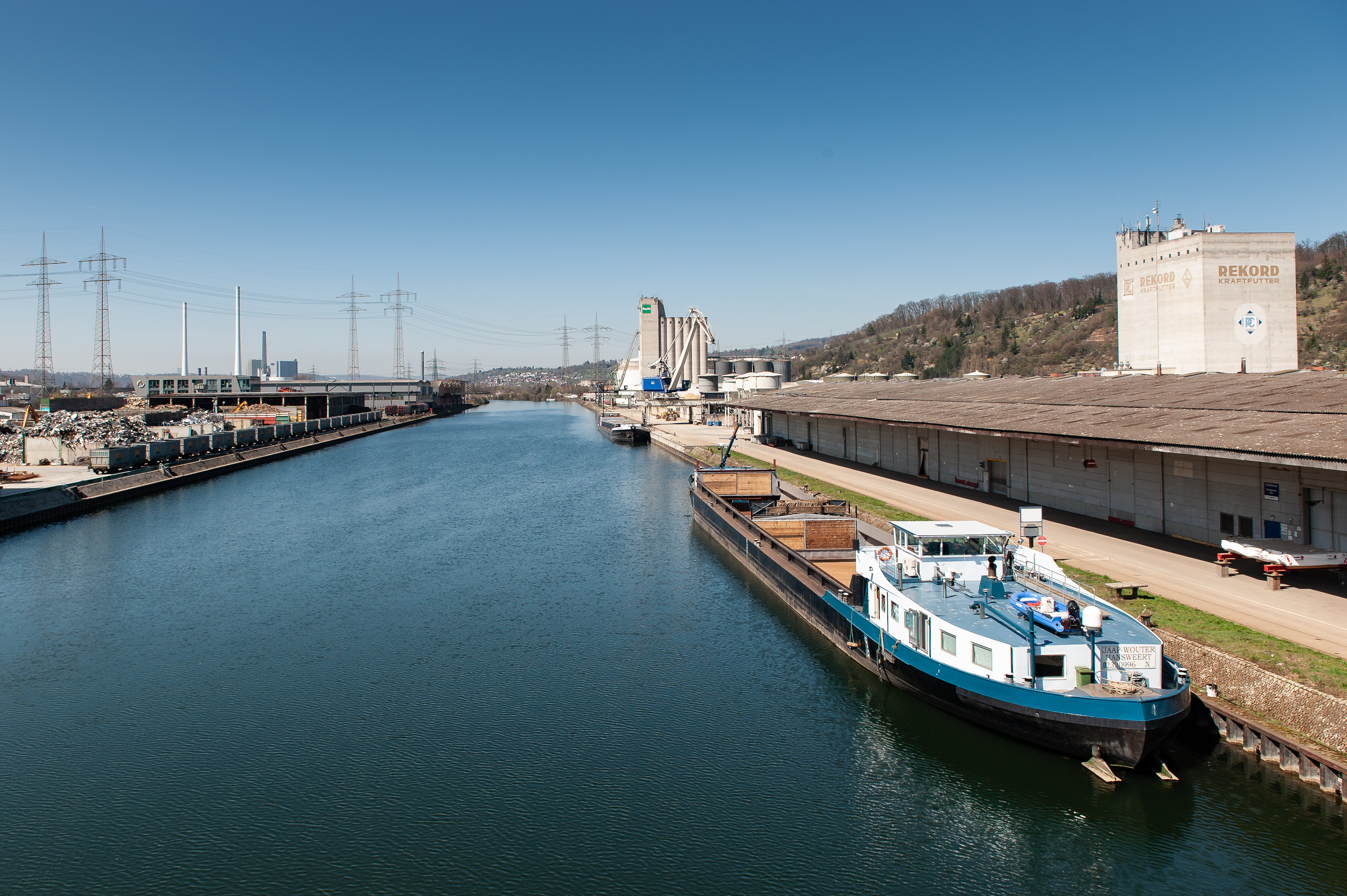
Neckar-Harbour

The Neckar harbour (dt. Neckarhafen) in Plochingen has been the end point of the navigable Neckar since 12 July 1968. It was designed as a port for commercial inland navigation exclusively for the pure transport of goods without passenger shipping. The port area extends along two harbour basins. Responsible for the conception, realisation and development was from 1954 to 1992 harbour director Heinz Kreeb. Since 1992, Eberhard Weiß has been entrusted with the management of the port. Nearly 20 companies with an investment volume of around EUR 100,000,000 have settled in the Neckar harbour. The main transhipment goods are iron/steel products/scrap, animal feed/grain, mineral oil and wood. The goods handling per year amounts to more than 1,300,000 tons.

=== Resident companies ===
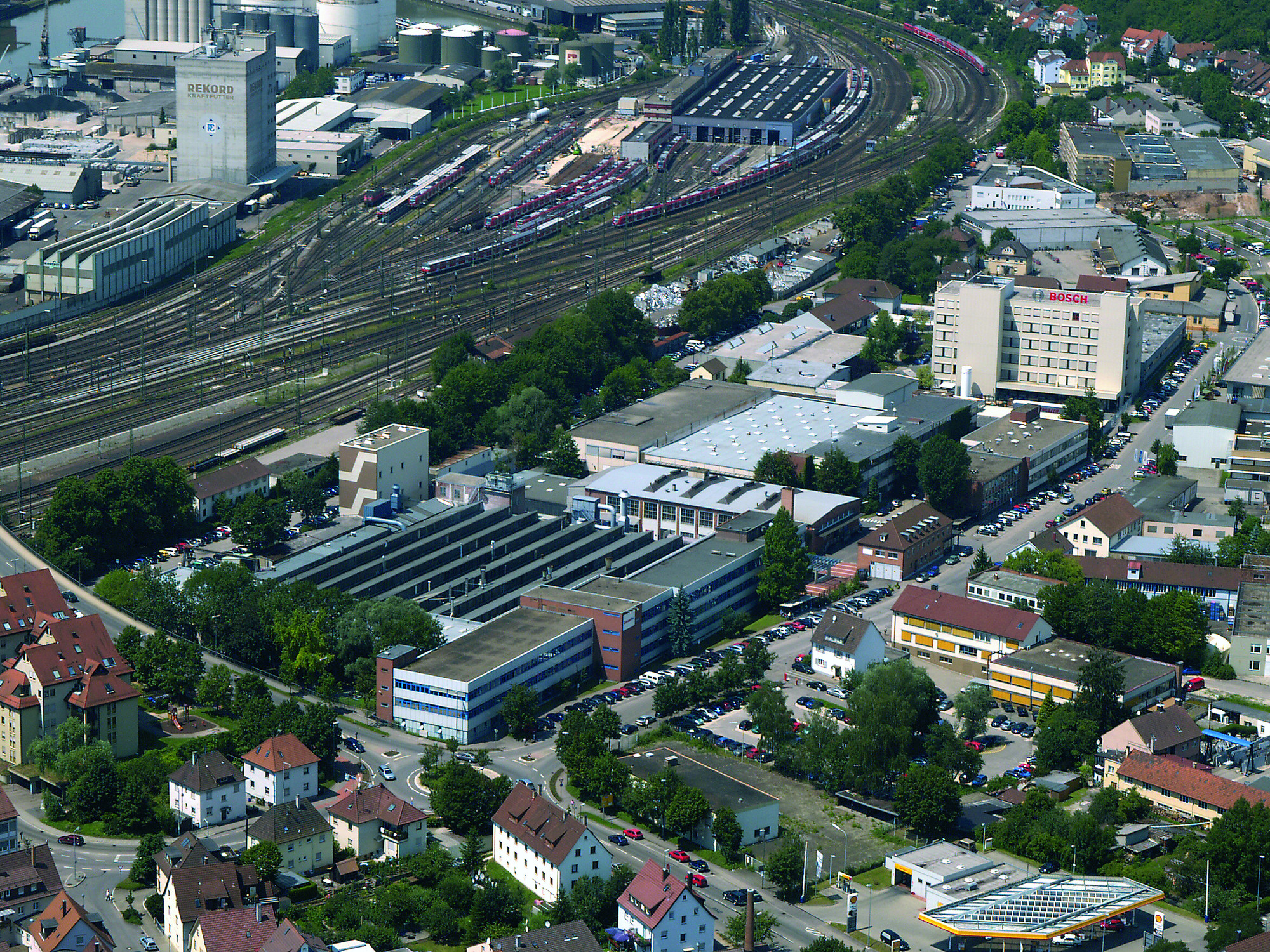
The industrial park Fabrikstraße with the Robert Bosch GmbH and CeramTec GmbH, in the background the railway depot Plochingen

- German headquarters of Decathlon (sports retail chain)
- CeramTec GmbH (Technical Ceramic)
- Robert Bosch GmbH (Motor vehicle testing technology, training)

=== Educational institutions ===
Plochingen has a Gymnasium (Gymnasium Plochingen), a Realschule, a Grundschule and Werkrealschule, a Special school and a pure primary school. There are also nine kindergartens in the town. Furthermore, Plochingen is home to a GARP education centre for the IHK Region Stuttgart e.V.

== Culture and sights ==
Plochingen is lies on the Württemberger Weinstraße with many sights.

=== Buildings ===
- The Marketplace with half-timbered buildings, including the Old Town Hall (1530)
- The Gothic St Blasius Church (1488)
- St Odile's Chapel (1328)
- The Gablenberg House (1799)
- The Hundertwasser House "Living under the Rain Tower" (1991–1994)
- The modern town hall (1900) and accompanying city gallery
- The Catholic St Konrad's Church (1929)
- The Weinbergturm (Vineyard Tower)
- Jubilee Tower at Stumpenhof
- Les Toilettes (2007), a public toilet building designed by Tomi Ungerer, next to St Odile's Chapel

=== Free time ===
The Park railway in the Neckarauen is a 1.5-kilometre-long (0.93 mi) park railway that is operated every weekend from Easter Monday to October.

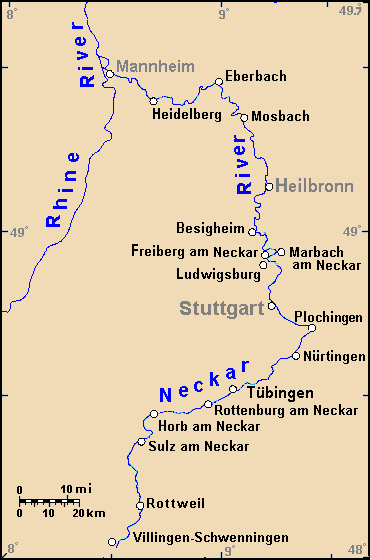
Plochingen on Neckar River

== Twin towns – sister cities ==
Plochingen is twinned with:

- Landskrona, Sweden (1971)
- Zwettl, Austria (1993)
- Oroszlány, Hungary (2010)

== Notable people ==
- Christian Friedrich Löw (1778–1843), Schultheiß in Beuren, Member of Landtag
- Ferdinand Huttenlocher (1856–1925), sculptor and painter
- Heinz Mauser (1919–1995), chemist and professor
- Gotthilf Fischer (1928–2020), choral conductor known for founding the Fischer-Chöre
- Gerhard Mahler (1930–1996), entrepreneur and politician (CDU), former Member of Landtag
- Egon Eigenthaler (de) (born 1938), advertising graphic designer, politician (Republikaner), Member of Landtag
- Siegfried K. Wiedmann (born 1938), electrical engineer
- Hanns-Werner Heister (born 1946), musicologist
- Thomas Franz (born 1953), major general of German Luftwaffe

== Gallery ==
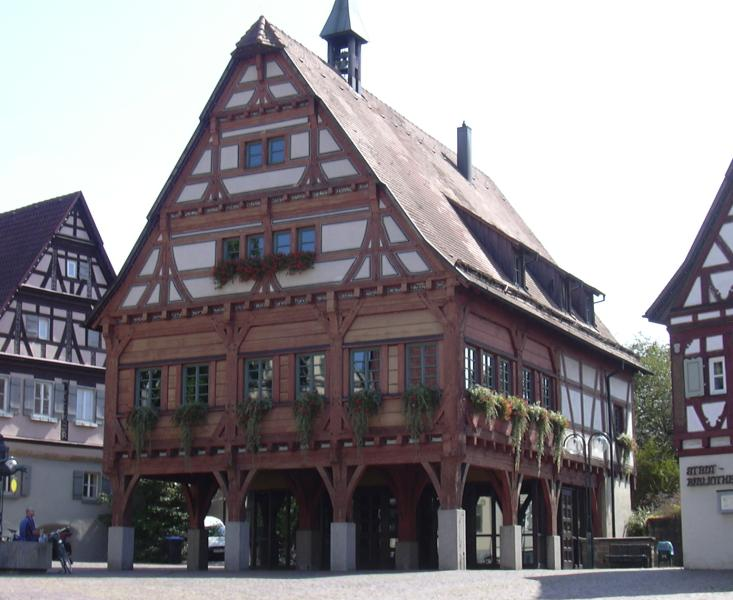
The Old Town Hall

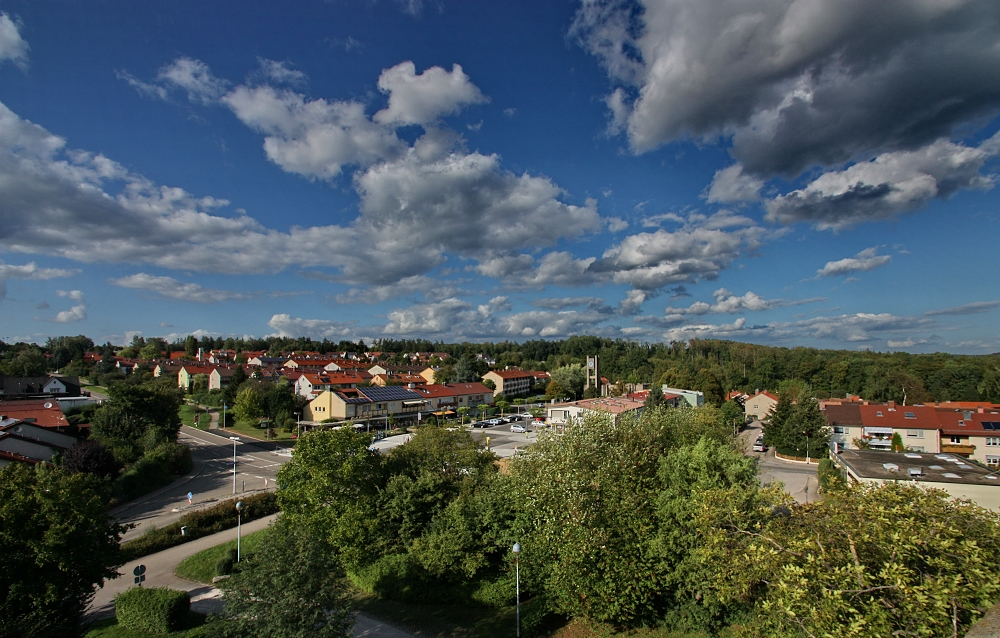
View of the Stumpenhof district

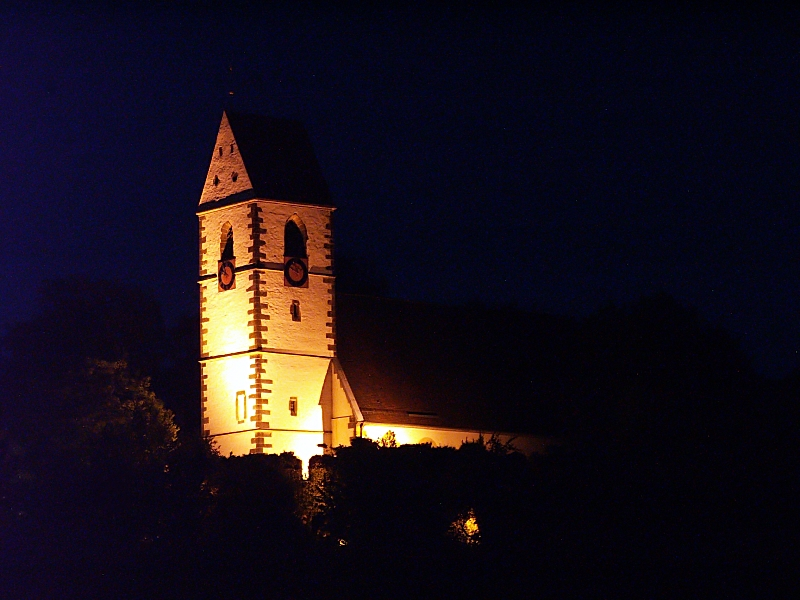
The Protestant town church at night

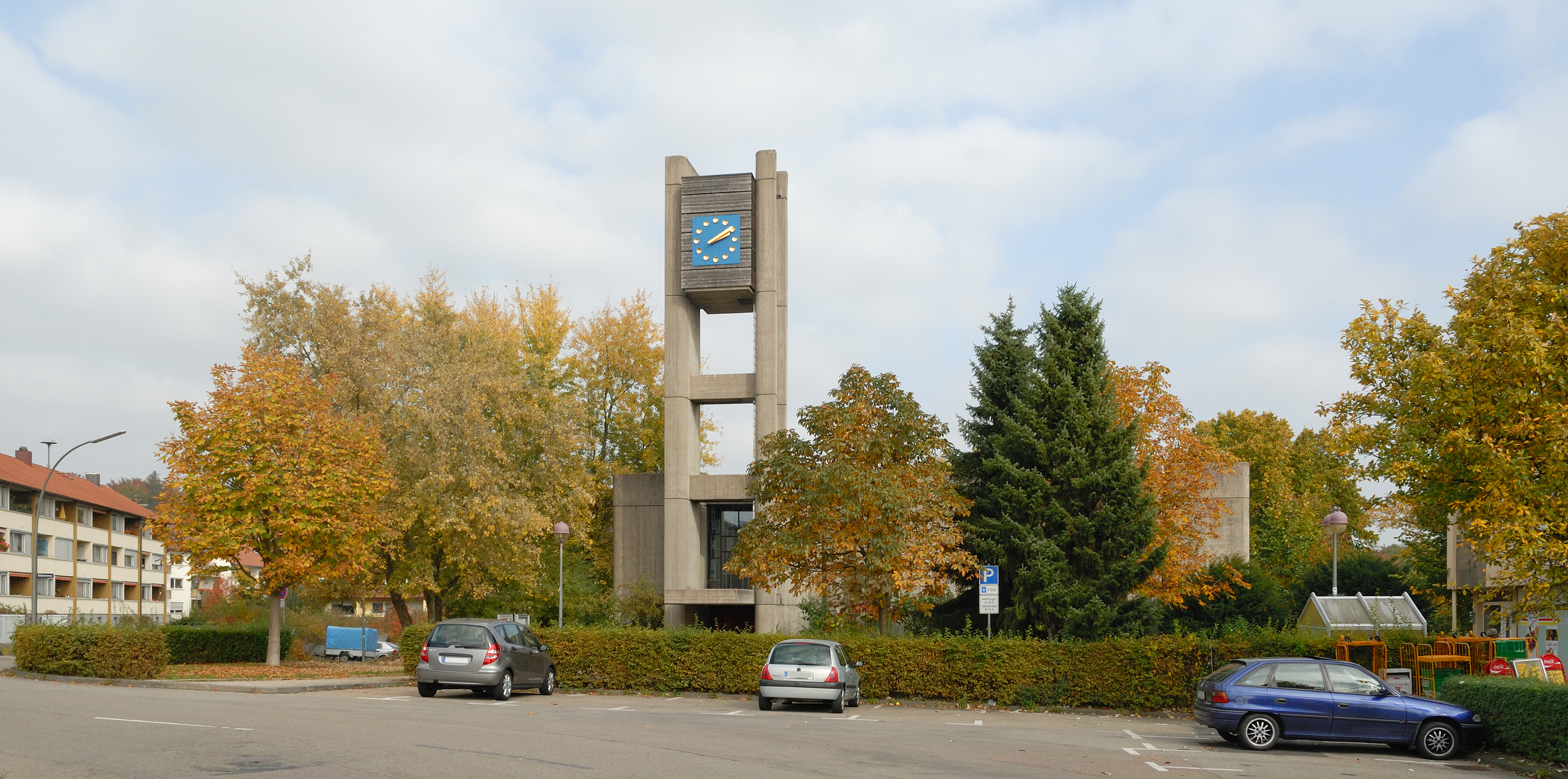
Paul-Gerhardt-Church, Stumpenhof district
