= Bulky waste =

Household waste too large for regular collection

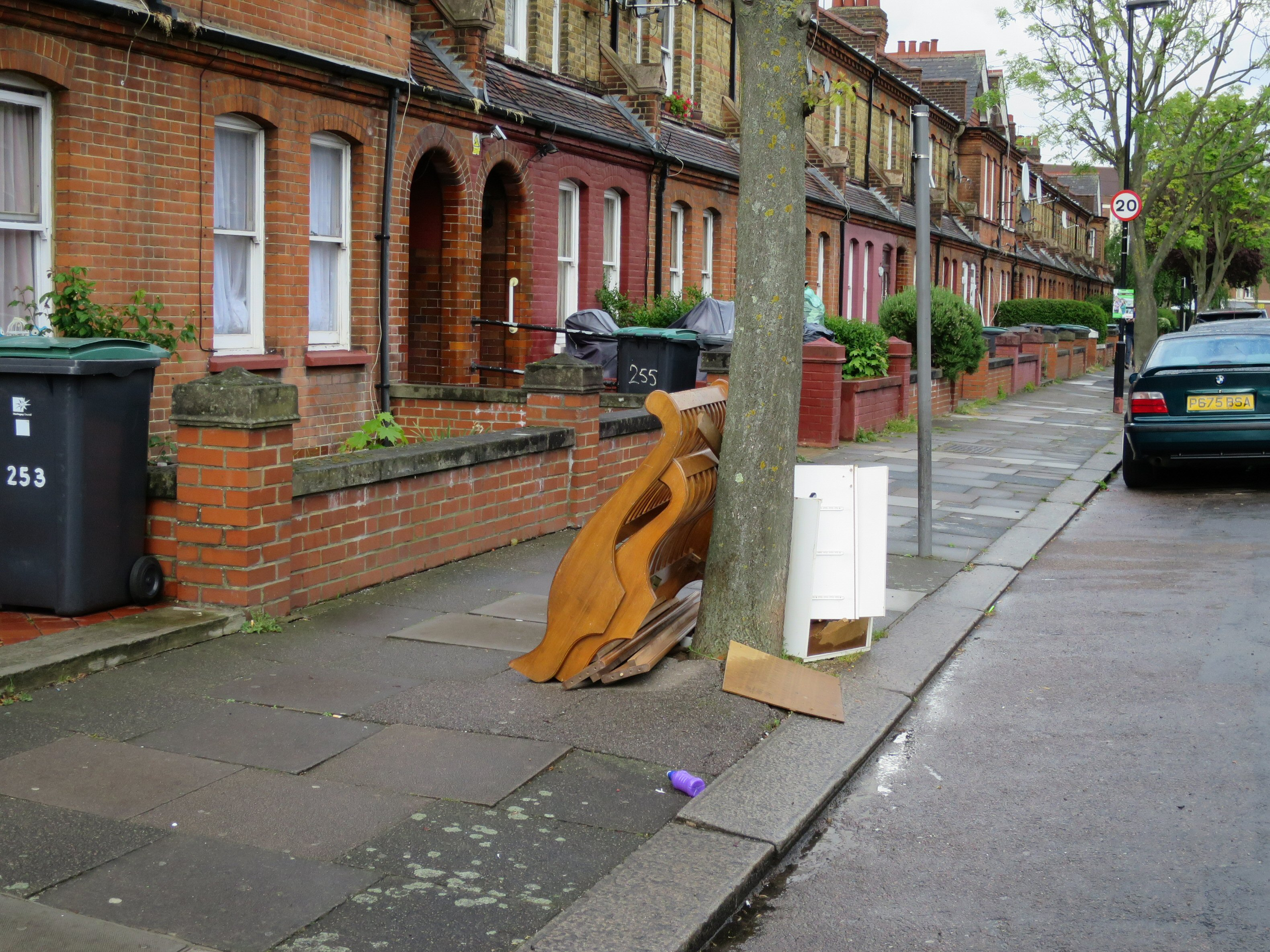
Items too large for the nearby wheelie bin placed in the street in Haringey, London

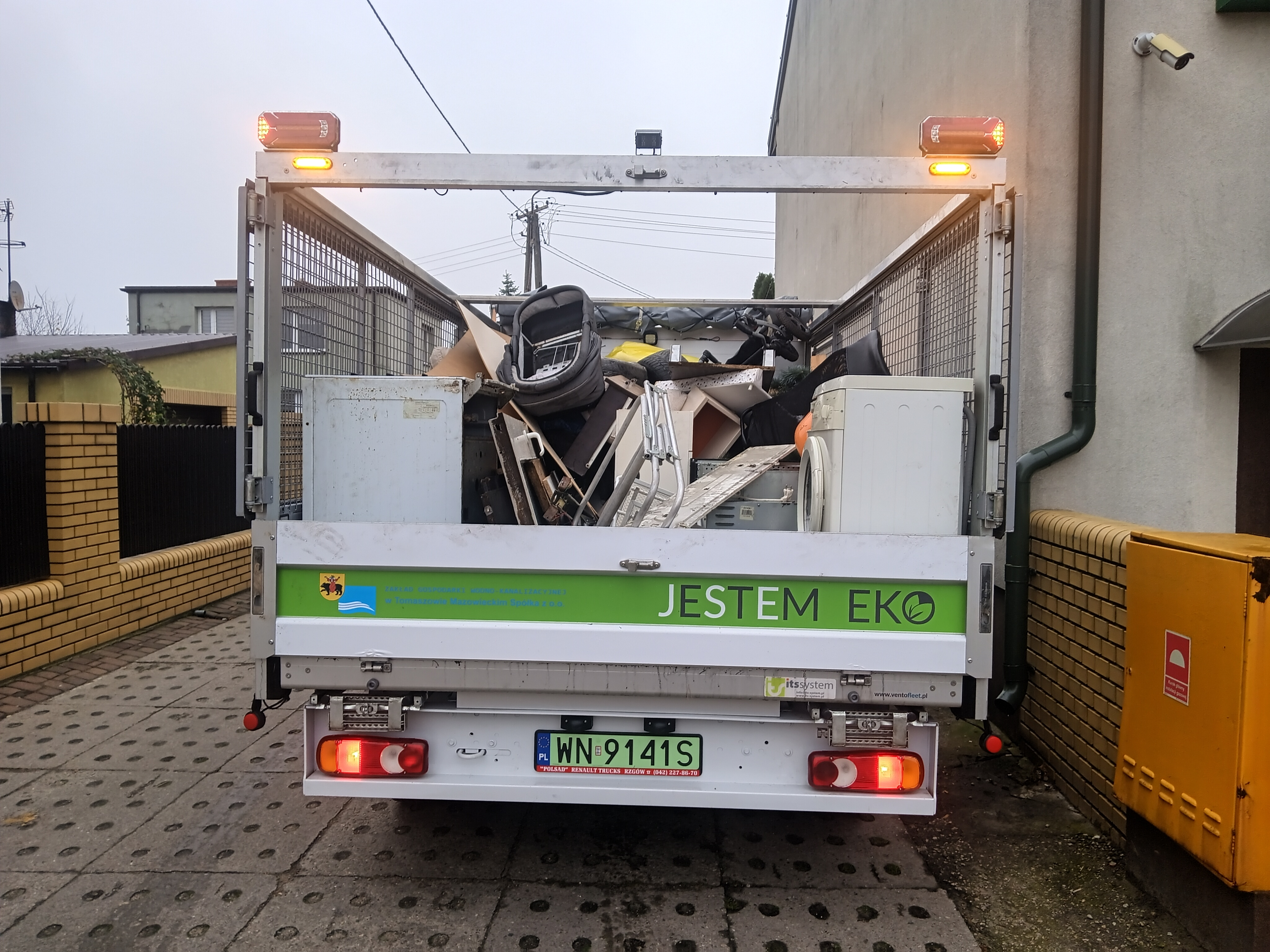
The electric delivery vehicle of a municipal company collecting bulky waste from residents of Tomaszów Mazowiecki, Poland.

Bulky waste, bulk waste, or bulky refuse is a technical term taken from waste management to describe waste types that are too large to be accepted by the regular waste collection. It is usually picked up periodically in many countries from the streets or pavements of the area.

This service is provided free of charge in many places, but often a fee has to be paid.

Bulky waste items include discarded furniture (couches, recliners, tables), large appliances (refrigerators, ovens, TVs), and plumbing fixtures (bathtubs, toilets, sinks). A large amount (30-60%, depending on area) of bulky waste is picked up by scavengers before it is collected. Branches, brush, logs and other green waste are also categorized as bulky waste, although they may be collected separately for shredding and/or composting.

Grapple trucks, also known as knuckleboom loaders, are often used to collect bulky waste. In the UK, refuse collection vehicles (RCVs) or crushers are being increasingly phased out as more bulky waste is diverted for re-use and recycling.
