= Weizsäcker family =

German family of notable statesmen, scientists, and military officers

Coat of arms of Richard von Weizsäcker

The Weizsäcker family (German: [ˈvaɪtszɛkɐ]), some with the nobiliary particle von (German pronunciation: [fɔn]), originated in the former Kingdom of Württemberg and has had prominent and influential members over several generations. Its most notable members included Karl von Weizsäcker, a prime minister of the Kingdom of Württemberg and Richard von Weizsäcker, a president of Germany. Other prominent members included a diplomat in Nazi Germany, a prominent environmental scientist, and the physicist after whom the Bethe–Weizsäcker formula was named.

I. Christian Ludwig Weizsäcker (1785–1831), domestic chaplain to the Prince of Hohenlohe-Öhringen

A. Hugo Weizsäcker (1820–1834)
B. Karl Heinrich Weizsäcker (1822–1899), Protestant theologian and Chancellor of Tübingen University

1. Karl von Weizsäcker (1853–1926), 1906–1918 Ministerpräsident to King William II of Württemberg

a. Ernst von Weizsäcker (1882–1951), diplomat who served Nazi Germany as Secretary of State for Foreign Affairs and Ambassador to the Holy See

i. Carl Friedrich von Weizsäcker (1912–2007), physicist and philosopher

(a). Carl Christian von Weizsäcker (born 1938), professor of political economy
(b). Ernst Ulrich von Weizsäcker (born 1939), scientist and politician

(1). Jakob von Weizsäcker (born 1970), economist and politician

(c). Elisabeth Raiser (née von Weizsäcker, born 1940), historian and Protestant lay leader
(d). Heinrich Wolfgang von Weizsäcker (born 1947), professor of mathematics

(1). Georg von Weizsäcker (born 1973), professor of economics

ii. Adelheid von Weizsäcker (1916–2004), m. Botho-Ernst Graf zu Eulenburg-Wicken (1903–1944)
iii. Heinrich von Weizsäcker (1917–1939), German Army Lieutenant, killed in action (World War II)
iv. Richard von Weizsäcker (1920–2015), statesman and President of Germany 1984–1994, m. Marianne von Weizsäcker, née von Kretschmann (born 1932)

(a). Robert Klaus von Weizsäcker (born 1954), professor of political economy, former president of the German Chess Federation
(b). Andreas von Weizsäcker (1956–2008), professor of art
(c). Beatrice von Weizsäcker (born 1958), journalist and author
(d). Fritz von Weizsäcker (1960–2019), professor of medicine, stabbed and killed during a class in Berlin.

b. Viktor von Weizsäcker (1886–1957), neurologist

C. Julius Weizsäcker (1828–1889), historian

1. Julius Hugo Wilhelm Weizsäcker (1861–1939), lawyer
2. Heinrich Weizsäcker (1862–1945), professor of art history

a. Karl Hermann Wilhelm Weizsäcker (1898–1918)
