= Julius Weizsäcker =

German historian (1828–1889)

Julius Ludwig Friedrich Weizsäcker (13 February 1828 in Öhringen – 3 September 1889 in Bad Kissingen) was a German historian. He specialized in medieval history and early modern history. A member of the distinguished Weizsäcker family, his brother was the Protestant theologian Karl Heinrich Weizsäcker.

He studied theology and history at the University of Tübingen, obtaining his habilitation in 1859. He was successively a professor of history at the universities of Erlangen (from 1863), Tübingen (from 1867), Strasbourg (from 1872), Göttingen (from 1876) and Berlin (from 1881).

== Published works ==
- Der Kampf gegen den Chorepiskopat des fränkischen Reiches im 9. Jahrhundert, 1859 – The struggle against the Chorepiscopate of the Frankish Empire in the 9th century.
- Der Rheinische Bund von 1254, 1879 – The Rhenish League of 1254.

He was an editor of the Reichstagsakten (Reichstag files of the Holy Roman Empire).
