= 1989 West German presidential election =

- 23 May 1989
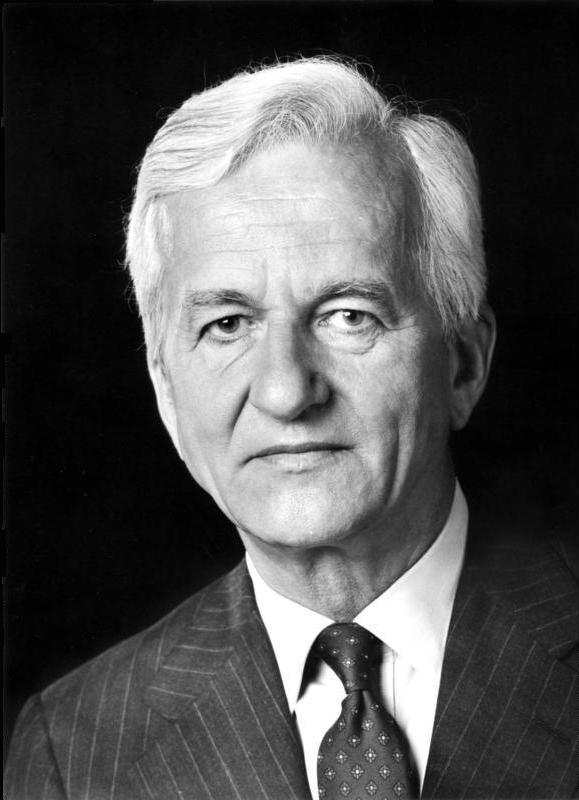
Nominee	Richard von Weizsäcker
Party	CDU
Home state	West Berlin
Electoral vote	881
Percentage	84.9%
Nominators	CDU/CSU, SPD, Grüne, FDP
President before election
Richard von Weizsäcker
CDU
Elected President
Richard von Weizsäcker
CDU

An indirect presidential election (officially the 9th Federal Convention) was held in West Germany on 23 May 1989. The only candidate was incumbent President Richard von Weizsäcker, who had the support of all four major parties (CDU/CSU, SPD, FDP, and The Greens). It is so far the only time that a presidential candidate ran unopposed. It was also the last presidential election held before German reunification.

== Composition of the Federal Convention ==
The president is elected by the Federal Convention consisting of all the members of the Bundestag and an equal number of delegates representing the states. These are divided proportionally by population to each state, and each state's delegation is divided among the political parties represented in its parliament so as to reflect the partisan proportions in the parliament.

By party
Party	Members
CDU/CSU	479
SPD	419
FDP	71
Greens	67
Republicans	1
Independent	1
Total	1038

By state
State	Members
Bundestag	519
Baden-Württemberg	77
Bavaria	94
Berlin	16
Bremen	5
Hamburg	13
Hesse	46
Lower Saxony	63
North Rhine-Westphalia	141
Rhineland-Palatinate	32
Saarland	9
Schleswig-Holstein	23
Total	1038

== Results ==
Candidate	Parties	Votes	%
Richard von Weizsäcker	CDU, CSU, SPD, FDP, The Greens	881	84.9
Against votes		108	10.4
Abstention		30	2.9
Invalid votes		3	0.3
Not present		16	1.5
Total		1,038	100
