= Ernst von Weizsäcker =

German diplomat and war criminal (1882–1951)

Ernst Freiherr von Weizsäcker
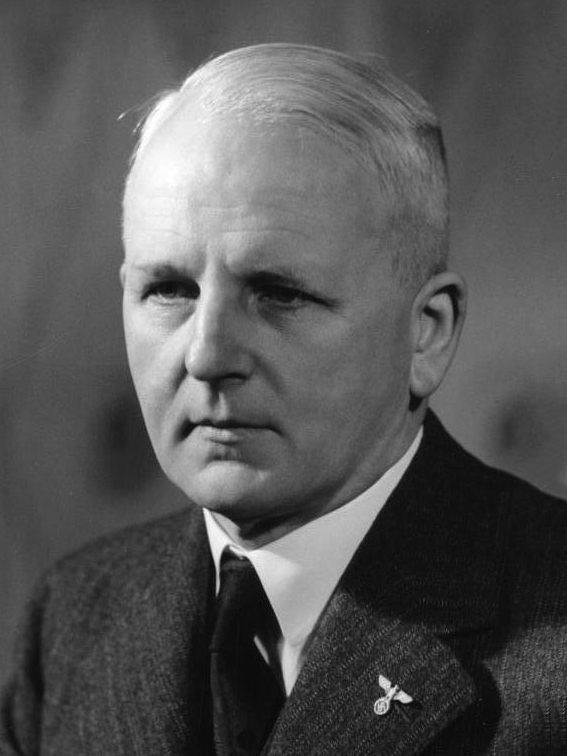
- Weizsäcker in 1938

Secretary of State at the Foreign Office
- In office 1938–1943
- Preceded by: Hans Georg von Mackensen
- Succeeded by: Gustav Adolf Steengracht von Moyland

Ambassador to the Holy See
- In office 1943–1945
- Preceded by: Diego von Bergen
- Succeeded by: Wolfgang Jaenicke (1954)

Personal details
- Born: 25 May 1882 Stuttgart, Kingdom of Württemberg, German Empire
- Died: 4 August 1951 (aged 69) Lindau, West Germany
- Spouse: Marianne von Graevenitz (m. 1911)
- Children: Carl Friedrich; Ernst Viktor; Adelheid; Heinrich; Richard

Military service
- Allegiance: German Empire; Weimar Republic; Nazi Germany
- Branch/service: Imperial German Navy; Reichsmarine; Schutzstaffel
- Years of service: 1900–1920; 1938–1945
- Rank: Korvettenkapitän; SS-Brigadeführer
- Battles/wars: First World War; Second World War
- Awards: Iron Cross (1st class); Iron Cross (2nd class)

Ernst Heinrich Freiherr von Weizsäcker (25 May 1882 – 4 August 1951) was a German naval officer, diplomat, politician and convicted war criminal. He served as State Secretary at the Foreign Office of Nazi Germany from 1938 to 1943, and as its ambassador to the Holy See from 1943 to 1945. He was a member of the prominent Weizsäcker family, and the father of German President Richard von Weizsäcker and physicist and philosopher Carl Friedrich von Weizsäcker.

In 1949, as part of the Ministries Trial, Weizsäcker was found guilty of crimes against peace, war crimes, and crimes against humanity, and sentenced to 7 years in prison, although the same year, the sentence was reduced to 5 years after his conviction for crimes against peace was overturned.

== Early life ==
Weizsäcker was born in 1882 in Stuttgart to Karl Hugo von Weizsäcker, who would become minister president (the equivalent of prime minister) of the Kingdom of Württemberg and raised to personal nobility in 1897, and to Paula von Meibom. In 1911, he married Marianne von Graevenitz, who belonged to the old nobility. In 1916 he became a Freiherr (Baron), as his father and his family were raised to the inheritable nobility, less than two years before the fall of the Württembergish monarchy.

== Naval career ==
In 1900, Weizsäcker joined the Imperial German Navy to become an officer, serving mainly in Berlin. In 1916, during the Battle of Jutland of the First World War, he served as Flag Lieutenant to Admiral Reinhard Scheer aboard the German flagship SMS Friedrich der Grosse. In 1917, during the latter portion of the war, he earned the Iron Cross (both classes) and was the next year was promoted to Korvettenkapitän (corvette captain) (equivalent to the British and American rank of lieutenant commander).

He was a member of the Naval Staff led by Admiral Reinhard Scheer from August 1918. From June 1919 to April 1920, he served as naval attaché to The Hague.

== Diplomatic career ==
Weizsäcker joined the German Foreign Service in 1920. He was appointed as Consul to Basel in 1921, as Councillor in Copenhagen in 1924 and was stationed in Geneva from 1927. He became head of the department for disarmament in 1928 and was appointed as envoy to Oslo in 1931 and to Bern in 1933. In 1936, as ambassador to Bern, Weizsäcker played a key role in stripping Thomas Mann of his German citizenship. He became Director of the Policy Department at the Foreign Office in 1937 and the following year he was appointed as Staatssekretär ("State Secretary") -- the second ranking official after the Foreign Minister in the German Foreign Office.

He was encouraged by his superior to join the ruling National Socialist German Workers' Party (German: Nationalsozialistische Deutsche Arbeiterpartei or NSDAP), which he did in 1938, and he was also awarded an honorary rank in the Schutzstaffel (SS). In 1938, Weizsäcker was opposed to the general trend in German foreign policy of attacking Czechoslovakia for fear that it might cause a general war that Germany would lose. He had no moral objections to the idea of destroying Czechoslovakia, only the timing of the attack. Weizsäcker had some contacts with members of the German opposition, but during his interrogations after the war, he never claimed to be a member of the resistance. It was only after he was brought to trial that Weizsäcker first claimed to be an anti-Nazi working with all his heart and might to overthrow the Nazi regime.

On 19 August 1938, Weizsäcker wrote in a memo to Foreign Minister Joachim von Ribbentrop:

"I again opposed the whole theory of (an attack on Czechoslovakia) and observed that we should have to wait political developments until the English lose interest in the Czech matter and would tolerate our action, before we could tackle the affair without risk".

Weizsäcker never sent his memo to Ribbentrop. Together with the Abwehr chief, Admiral Wilhelm Canaris, and the Army Chief of Staff, General Ludwig Beck, Weizsäcker was a leader of the antiwar group in the German government, which was determined to avoid a war in 1938 that it felt Germany would lose. The group was not necessarily committed to the overthrow of the regime but was loosely allied to another more radical group, the "anti-Nazi" faction centred on Colonel Hans Oster and Hans Bernd Gisevius, which wanted to use the crisis as an excuse for executing a putsch to overthrow the regime. The divergent aims between these two factions produced considerable tension. The historian Eckart Conze stated in a 2010 interview:

"An overthrow of Hitler was out of the question. The group wanted to avoid a major war and the potential catastrophic consequences for Germany. Their goal wasn't to get rid of the dictator but, as they saw it, to bring him to his senses".

Weizsäcker was promoted to SS-Brigadeführer on 30 January 1942.

=== Ambassador to the Vatican ===
After the German defeat in the Battle of Stalingrad in 1943 and the changing German war fortunes, and following his own request, Weizsäcker resigned as State Secretary and was appointed German Ambassador to the Holy See from 1943 to 1945.

When received by the Cardinal Secretary of State Luigi Maglione on 6 January 1944, Weizsäcker stated, "If Germany as a bulwark against communism should fall, all of Europe will become communist". To this, Maglione replied, "What a misfortune, that Germany with its antireligious policies has stirred up such concerns". Similar representations were repeated by Weizsäcker to Monsignore Giovanni Battista Montini, later Pope Paul VI.

Weizsäcker's record at the Vatican was mixed. In Berlin, he had refused to accept a papal note protesting against the treatment of occupied Poland. During the German occupation of Rome, Weizsäcker did almost nothing to stop the deportation of Jews, albeit he helped individuals to avoid persecution, and helped to free Rome from all German military bases in an effort to discourage Allied bombing of the city. He also advised the Foreign Office that drafting Jews for labour camps inside Italy would be less likely to draw a papal protest than deporting them. According to Richard J. Evans, Weizsäcker shared the opinion of Ulrich von Hassell that the Final Solution was a "devilish campaign".

"His messages and documents to Berlin were nothing but lies," his coworker Albrecht von Kessel later said. In those messages to Berlin, Weizsäcker purposely painted Pope Pius XII as mild, diplomatic, indecisive and pro-German to help the Pope and to avoid anti-German sentiment in Italy. Like the commanding Waffen SS General Karl Wolff, Weizsäcker was clearly opposed to Hitler's plan to occupy the Vatican during which Weizsäcker feared the Pope being shot "fleeing while avoiding arrest".

Weizsäcker continued to present the Vatican with anticommunist slogans, and he both threatened a separate Soviet-German peace and requested from Monsignore Domenico Tardini the immediate mounting of a papal peace initiative to end the war in the West so that Germany could finish communism in the East. Tardini saw that as a transparent effort to obtain a military solution.

Like several other German officials, Weizsäcker attempted to negotiate the survival of some segment of the government and to avoid the unconditional surrender of Germany, but his efforts failed in bringing up the subject of "a German transition government, and the likelihood of his being a member of it".

== Post-war and trial ==
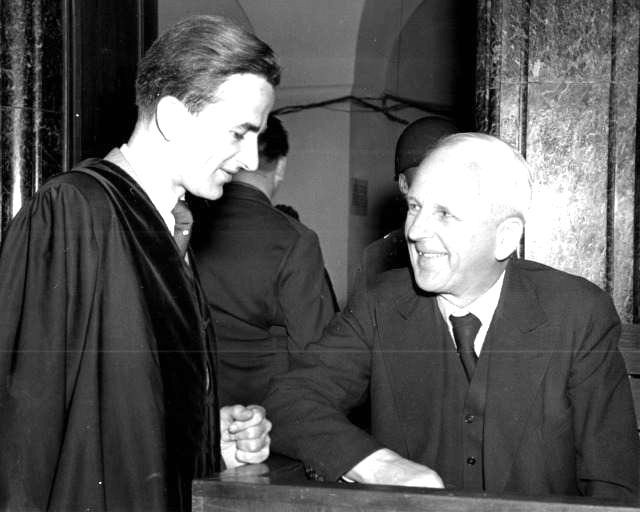
Ernst von Weizsäcker (right) with his son Richard at post war trial

After the end of the war, Weizsäcker initially remained in the Vatican City with his wife, as a guest of the Pope and a member of the diplomatic corps. He did not return to Germany until 1946. Weizsäcker was arrested on 25 July 1947 in Nuremberg and was put on trial in the Ministries Trial, also known as the Wilhelmstrasse Trial, after the location of the German Foreign Office in Berlin. The Ministries Trial was one of 12 trials conducted by Nuremberg Military Tribunals in the American occupation zone. The American military tribunals started before and finished during the Berlin Blockade confrontation with the Soviets and proceeded without participation of the Soviet Union.

Weizsäcker's supporters claimed that he had been closely associated with the anti-Nazi resistance and a moderate force at the Foreign Office during the war.

Weizsäcker was charged with active cooperation with the deportation of French Jews to Auschwitz, as a crime against humanity. Weizsäcker, with the assistance of his son, the future German President Richard von Weizsäcker, who appeared as his assistant defence counsel (Richard was a law student during the trial), claimed that he had no knowledge of the purpose for which Auschwitz had been designed and believed that Jewish prisoners would face less danger if they were deported to the East. In 1948 Winston Churchill referred to his prosecution as "the kind of deadly error which, in my opinion, is being committed at this time".

In 1949, Weizsäcker was found guilty of crimes against peace, war crimes, and crimes against humanity, and sentenced to 7 years in prison. The same year, the sentence was reduced to 5 years, after his conviction for crimes against peace was overturned. In October 1950, after 3 years and 3 months of detention, he obtained an early release from prison in Landsberg after a new examination of his case by the Legislative Affairs Office of the US High Commissioner for Germany, John J. McCloy. Weizsäcker subsequently published his memoirs, written in prison, in which he portrayed himself as a supporter of the German Resistance.

== Death and legacy ==
Weizsäcker died of a stroke on 4 August 1951, at the age of 69.

In 2010, historian Eckart Conze assessed the belief that the German Foreign Office had no involvement with Nazi war crimes in an interview:

"The legend stems from individuals associated with the Weizsäcker defense. Former diplomats, such as the brothers Erich and Theo Kordt, played a key role in the effort, as did other members of the traditional upper class, which Weizsäcker represented. One of them was his defense lawyer, Hellmut Becker, the son of the Prussian culture minister, Carl Heinrich Becker, and another was Marion Gräfin Dönhoff, a young journalist who sharply criticized the trial in Die Zeit. They all knew that if they succeeded in exonerating Weizsäcker, they would have rehabilitated the national conservative, aristocratic and bourgeois upper class."

== Awards and decorations ==
- Knight's Cross of the Order of the Red Eagle 4th class
- Order of the Crown (Prussia) 4th class
- Knight's Cross of the House Order of Hohenzollern with swords
- Iron Cross, 1st and 2nd class
- Hanseatic Cross of Lübeck
- Knight's Cross of the House and Merit Order of Peter Frederick Louis 2nd class
- Friedrich-August-Kreuz 1st class
- Knight's Cross of the Order of the White Falcon 2nd class
- Knight's Cross of the Military Merit Order (Württemberg)
- Knight's Cross of the Friedrich Order 1st class with swords
- Honour Cross of the World War 1914/1918

== Notes ==
Diplomatic posts
Preceded by Diego von Bergen	German Ambassador to the Holy See; 1943-1945	Succeeded by Wolfgang Jaenicke (1954)
