= Öhringen =

- Town
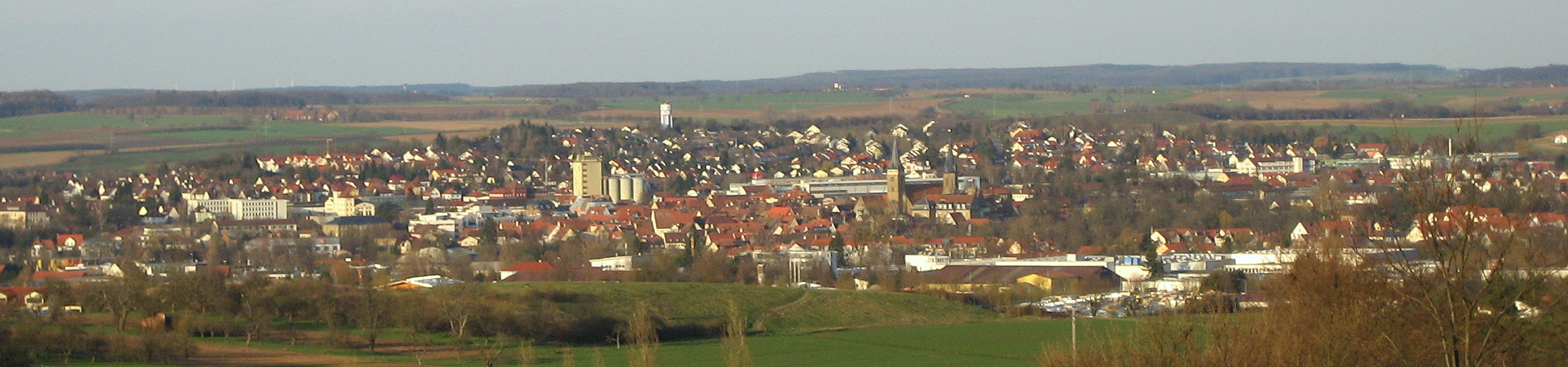

- Coat of arms

- Location of Öhringen within Hohenlohekreis district
- Interactive map of Öhringen
- Location within Germany Location within Baden-Württemberg
- Coordinates: 49°12′N 9°30′E
- Country: Germany
- State: Baden-Württemberg
- Admin. region: Stuttgart
- District: Hohenlohekreis

Government
  - Mayor (2017–25): Thilo Michler (Ind.)

Area
  - Total: 67.79 km^{2} (26.17 sq mi)
- Elevation: 230 m (750 ft)

Population (2025-12-31)
  - Total: 25,871
  - Density: 381.6/km^{2} (988.4/sq mi)
- Time zone: UTC+01:00 (CET)
  - Summer (DST): UTC+02:00 (CEST)
- Postal codes: 74613
- Dialling codes: 07941
- Vehicle registration: KÜN, ÖHR
- Website: www.oehringen.de

Öhringen (German pronunciation: [ˈøːʁɪŋən]; East Franconian: Ähringe) is the largest town in Hohenlohe (district) in the state of Baden-Württemberg, in southwest Germany, near Heilbronn. Öhringen is on the railline to Schwäbisch Hall and Crailsheim.

With a population of 24,374 (2019), the town is diverse. It is a quaint medieval place, and, among its ancient buildings, boasts a fine Evangelical church (German: Stiftskirche) containing carvings in cedar-wood from the 15th century and numerous interesting tombs and monuments; a Renaissance town hall; the building, now used as a library, which formerly belonged to a monastery, was erected in 1034; and a palace, the former residence of the princes of Hohenlohe-Öhringen.

Öhringen was known as Vicus Aurelii to the Romans. Eastwards of it runs the old limes Roman frontier wall, and numerous remains and inscriptions dating from the days of the Roman settlement have been discovered, including traces of three camps.

== Geography ==
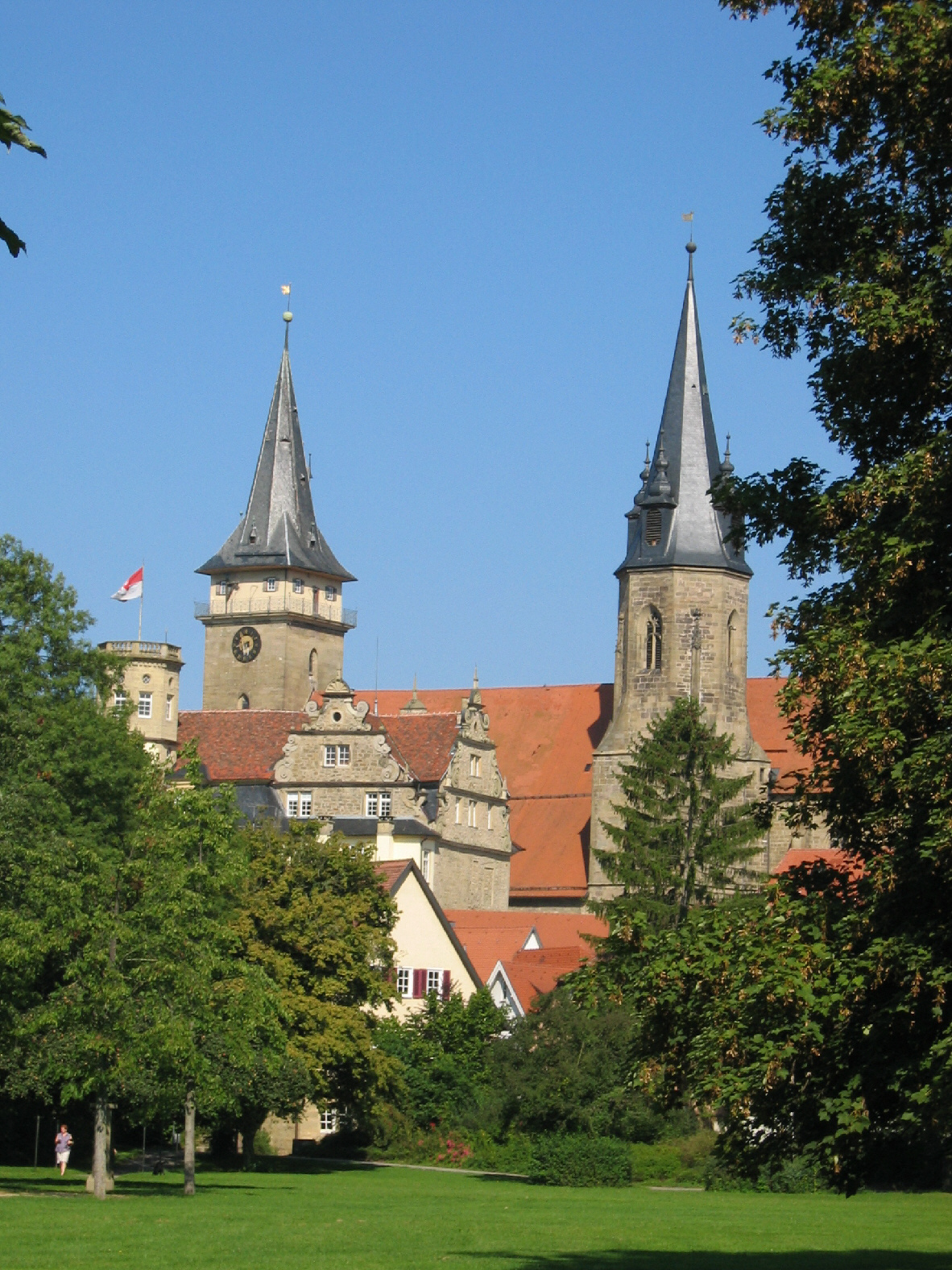
Evangelical church and the castle

=== Geographical location ===
Öhringen is located in the western, deeper part of the Hohenlohe plain, between the Keuper stage of the Swabian-Franconian Forest and the Kocher valley. The town spreads out over the flat valley of the Ohrn, a small river, which flows about 10 kilometres (6 mi) down the valley in the district Ohrnberg into the Kocher river. The town is situated between elevation 168 metres (551 ft), in the Kocher at the county border at Möglingen, and 486 m (1,594 ft), already above the forest on the Charles Mainhardt Furter plane, which belongs to the district Michelbach. The height of the town itself varies between 215–280 metres (705–919 ft).

The Öhringen area drains to the Kocher river, which runs between Ohrnberg and Sindringen, about 3 kilometres (2 miles) upstream from Ohrnberg mountain. The river leaves the region 6 km (4 miles) west of the district Möglingen. The Ohrn has created a broad, flat valley in the northwest of the borough and at Möhrig. From Unterohrn, the Ohrn extends to the confluence with the Kocher in the hard layers of the mussel limestone and has cut a deep valley. This section of the river course was declared Ohrntal in 1963 for the conservation area. The Maßholderbach and the Westernbach streams, which flow northwest of the town itself in the Ohrn, also create flat valleys in the northeastern part of the district.

The nature reserve Viehweide Michelbach is on the Michelbach section.

Öhringen is situated on the southwestern edge of the East Frankish language area, whereby the special Öhringer dialect influences can be identified from Rhenish Franconian and Swabian.

=== Geology ===
Geologically, the Hohenlohe-level is part of the southwest German Schichtstufenlandes (cuesta country) and belongs to the Triassic landscape. It is one of a band with varying breadth from the south-eastern edge of the Black Forest on the Franconian Gäubucht up to Franconia in the north extending to Gäuflächen and passes north and east into the Bauland region, the Tauber Valley, and the Haller Plain. The Hohenlohe plane itself includes the area around the Kocher river and Jagst river, to the foot of the mountains and Keuper forest, and is a forest-poor and fertile old farmland.

In the subsurface are the layers of the Muschelkalk period, on the wide open spaces of layers of the Lower Keuper and are partially covered by loam. The most hard rock of the Muschelkalk in Tauber, Kocher, and its many tributaries of the Jagst river have cut and made it close, varied and scenic valley portions. The Gäufläche is framed in the southern semicircle of the forests of the Löwenstein, Waldburger Limpurger and mountains and dominates it.[7]

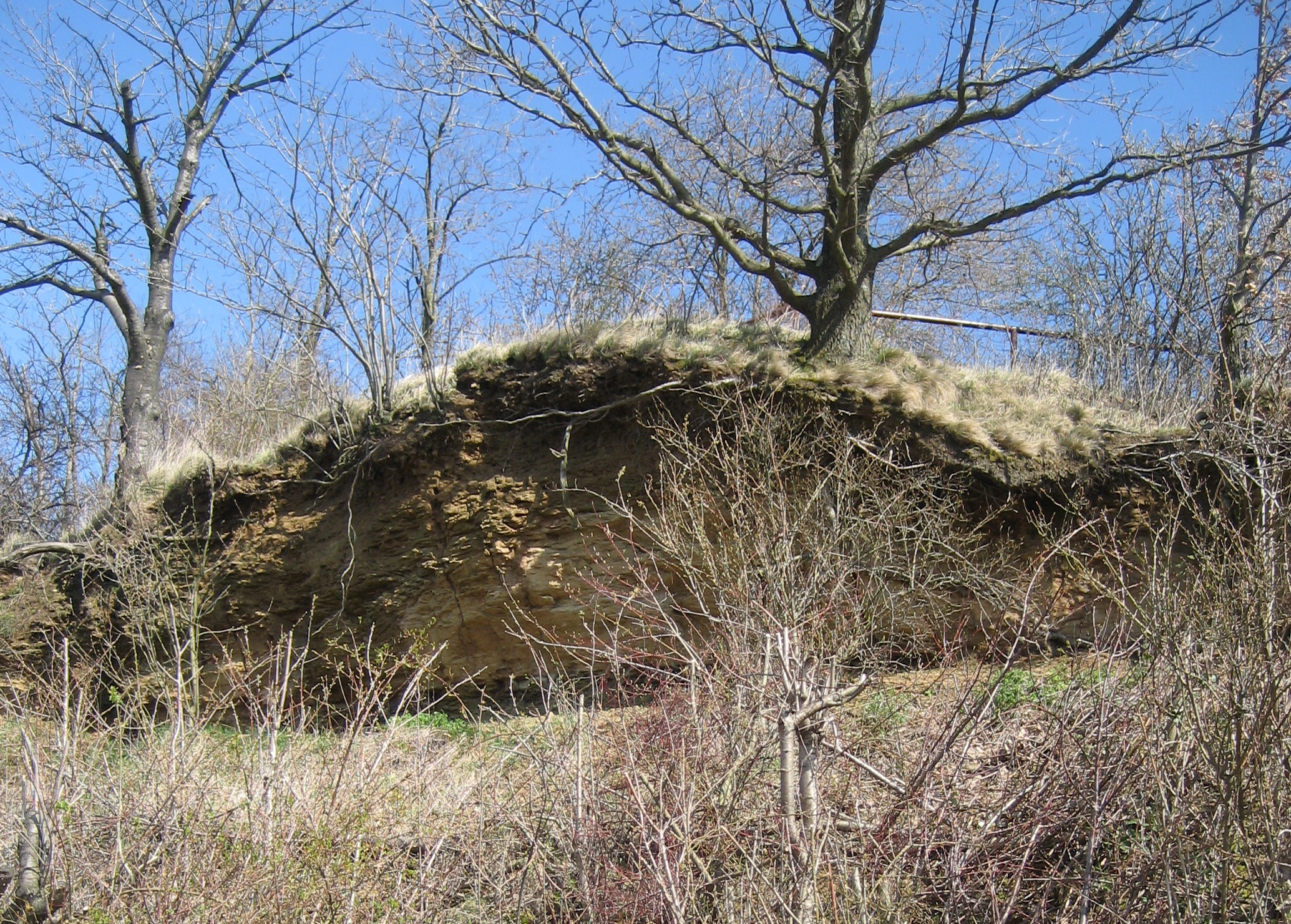
Outcrop of the Late Triassic, Keuper strata at Golberg mountain

This Keuper perimeter dominates the Hohenlohe level by about 130 metres (430 ft), in Waldenburg even up to 180 metres (590 ft). The Stufenbildner is mainly on reeds, gravel and sandstone, because of waterlogging little, but are mainly forested. By fluvial erosion of the edge of the Keuper forest mountains over time has been divided into several sections with spur-like projections. In some places individual mountains were separated, at Öhringen: the Golberg (325 metres, 1,066 ft), the Verrenberg (205 m) and the Lindelberg (334 metres, 1,096 ft). The landscape around Öhringen shares two important elements of the Southwest German cuesta country: the Gäuplatten and the Keuper forest mountains.

The limestone in the subsurface of Hohenlohe and Haller is widely karstified, as evidenced by more than 2,000 sinkholes, many dry valleys and a few cave systems. In several limestone quarries, the rock is mined and usually broken into gravel, even in the town of Öhringen (at Unterohrn). However, the limestone deposited in a little water-permeable layer nor Lower Keuper, which prevents a rapid infiltration of precipitation in the limestone. Moreover, as the Lower Keuper often has loess, this has created mineral-rich, arable soil easy to work with sufficient moisture.

The area surrounding Öhringen is strongly influenced by agriculture. Besides the cultivation of cereals, sugar beet, cabbage, corn, and rapeseed, the orchards and vineyards give the landscape for mi around its typical character.

=== Climate ===
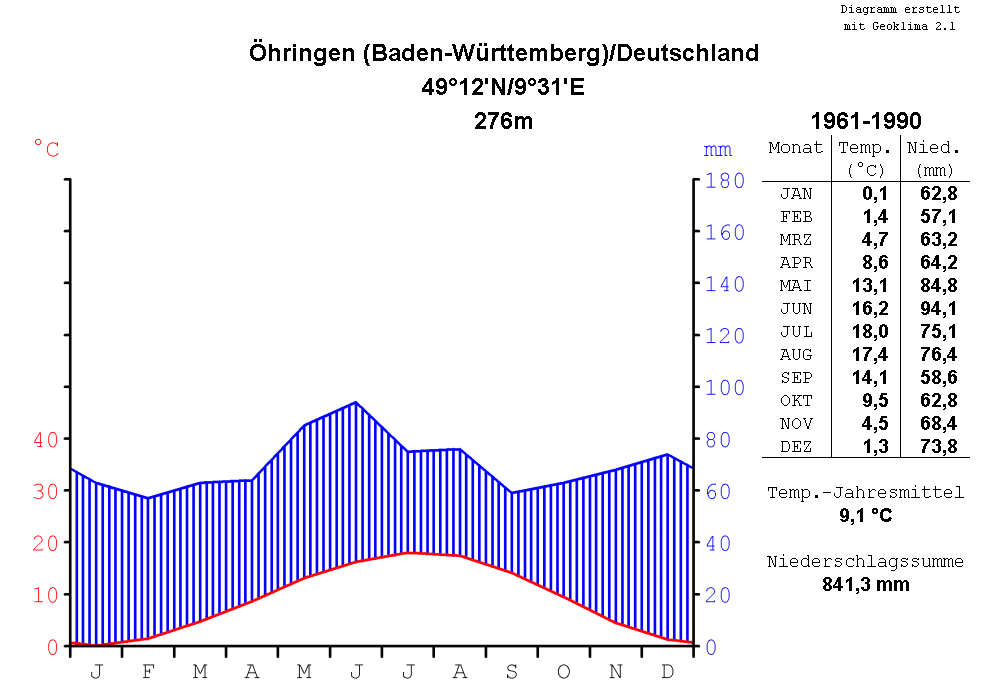
Climate chart of Öhringen (1961–1990)

Hohenlohe is part of the warm temperate Central European climate, with still predominantly maritime character. The changing topography on a small scale, especially between valley and high altitude, also causes the climate varying greatly from place to place. The local climate of Öhringen mediates between the milder of the Neckar river basin, the somewhat rougher the Hohenlohe plain and the upland climate prevailing in the Swabian-Franconian forest mountains. Öhringen has a mean annual temperature of 8.7 °C (47.7 °F). The monthly average for January and July are on Keuper height by about one to two degrees lower. These temperature differences are especially clear in the winter, when snow still lies on the heights, but it is melted away in the plane already. The average annual precipitation is falling in Öhringen at 734 millimetres (28.9 in), in the higher areas of the Keuper forest mountains up to 1,000 millimetres (39 in) and sometimes over it. The arrival of spring, with the beginning of the apple blossoms, is around May 4 in Öhringen, further to the east later, further west earlier. The German Weather Service operates a weather station in Öhringen.

The Öhringen weather station has recorded the following extreme values:

- Its highest temperature was 38.9 °C (102.0 °F) on 7 August 2015.
- Its lowest temperature was −25.8 °C (−14.4 °F) on 2 February 1956.
- Its greatest annual precipitation was 1,181.5 mm (46.52 in) in 1965.
- Its least annual precipitation was 512.4 mm (20.17 in) in 1964.
- The longest annual sunshine was 2,250.1 hours in 2022.
- The shortest annual sunshine was 1,431.7 hours in 1980.

Climate data for Öhringen (1991–2020 normals, extremes 1947–present)
| Month | Jan | Feb | Mar | Apr | May | Jun | Jul | Aug | Sep | Oct | Nov | Dec | Year |
|---|---|---|---|---|---|---|---|---|---|---|---|---|---|
| Record high °C (°F) | 17.8 (64.0) | 20.5 (68.9) | 24.5 (76.1) | 31.7 (89.1) | 32.6 (90.7) | 35.8 (96.4) | 38.5 (101.3) | 38.9 (102.0) | 34.1 (93.4) | 28.6 (83.5) | 22.4 (72.3) | 18.4 (65.1) | 38.9 (102.0) |
| Mean maximum °C (°F) | 12.6 (54.7) | 14.6 (58.3) | 19.4 (66.9) | 24.5 (76.1) | 28.4 (83.1) | 31.9 (89.4) | 33.6 (92.5) | 33.1 (91.6) | 28.1 (82.6) | 23.3 (73.9) | 16.7 (62.1) | 12.8 (55.0) | 35.0 (95.0) |
| Mean daily maximum °C (°F) | 4.5 (40.1) | 6.1 (43.0) | 10.8 (51.4) | 15.9 (60.6) | 19.8 (67.6) | 23.3 (73.9) | 25.4 (77.7) | 25.3 (77.5) | 20.4 (68.7) | 14.9 (58.8) | 8.7 (47.7) | 5.2 (41.4) | 15.0 (59.0) |
| Daily mean °C (°F) | 1.7 (35.1) | 2.4 (36.3) | 6.1 (43.0) | 10.3 (50.5) | 14.4 (57.9) | 17.8 (64.0) | 19.6 (67.3) | 19.3 (66.7) | 14.9 (58.8) | 10.3 (50.5) | 5.5 (41.9) | 2.6 (36.7) | 10.4 (50.7) |
| Mean daily minimum °C (°F) | −1.0 (30.2) | −0.8 (30.6) | 1.9 (35.4) | 4.9 (40.8) | 9.0 (48.2) | 12.4 (54.3) | 14.1 (57.4) | 13.9 (57.0) | 10.2 (50.4) | 6.6 (43.9) | 2.8 (37.0) | 0.0 (32.0) | 6.2 (43.2) |
| Mean minimum °C (°F) | −9.6 (14.7) | −8.0 (17.6) | −4.2 (24.4) | −1.6 (29.1) | 2.3 (36.1) | 7.0 (44.6) | 9.3 (48.7) | 8.4 (47.1) | 4.6 (40.3) | 0.1 (32.2) | −3.4 (25.9) | −8.5 (16.7) | −12.6 (9.3) |
| Record low °C (°F) | −24.4 (−11.9) | −25.8 (−14.4) | −17.3 (0.9) | −6.5 (20.3) | −2.8 (27.0) | 0.3 (32.5) | 4.2 (39.6) | 3.8 (38.8) | 0.2 (32.4) | −5.8 (21.6) | −13.4 (7.9) | −20.6 (−5.1) | −25.8 (−14.4) |
| Average precipitation mm (inches) | 58.4 (2.30) | 53.2 (2.09) | 61.8 (2.43) | 46.9 (1.85) | 74.3 (2.93) | 66.8 (2.63) | 78.5 (3.09) | 72.0 (2.83) | 61.1 (2.41) | 69.4 (2.73) | 62.6 (2.46) | 75.5 (2.97) | 780.4 (30.72) |
| Average precipitation days (≥ 1.0 mm) | 16.7 | 14.6 | 14.8 | 13.1 | 14.1 | 14.0 | 14.6 | 13.5 | 12.1 | 14.8 | 15.8 | 18.2 | 176.3 |
| Average snowy days (≥ 1.0 cm) | 8.2 | 6.6 | 2.4 | 0.2 | 0 | 0 | 0 | 0 | 0 | 0 | 1.2 | 5.1 | 23.7 |
| Average relative humidity (%) | 82.5 | 78.9 | 73.2 | 67.0 | 69.2 | 69.5 | 68.7 | 69.5 | 76.0 | 81.9 | 85.1 | 85.2 | 75.6 |
| Mean monthly sunshine hours | 58.6 | 83.2 | 135.3 | 189.2 | 216.8 | 230.9 | 242.8 | 229.5 | 171.3 | 113.2 | 62.2 | 48.8 | 1,780.7 |
Source 1: World Meteorological Organization
Source 2: Deutscher Wetterdienst / SKlima.de

=== Neighbouring communities ===
The following towns and villages – clockwise (starting from the north) – border the town of Öhringen: Forchtenberg, Zweiflingen, Neuenstein, Waldenburg, Pfedelbach and Bretzfeld (all Hohenlohe district), likewise Langenbrettach and Hardthausen am Kocher (both Heilbronn district). Together with Pfedelbach and Zweiflingen, Öhringen decides administrative matters. Öhringen advises and supports the other two municipalities in carrying out their duties, as well as technical issues of building and civil engineering works and the maintenance and expansion of the water of the second order.

Öhringen is a secondary centre of the region of Heilbronn-Franken; in the city of Heilbronn is a designated regional centre. The central region near the town Öhringen also includes the cities and towns Bretzfeld, Neuenstein, Waldenburg, Pfedelbach and Zweiflingen (all Hohenlohe).

=== Subdivisions ===
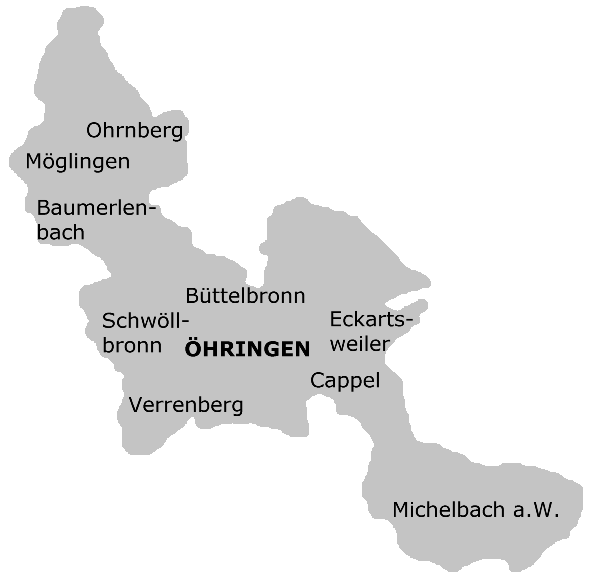

The urban areas of Öhringen consists of the town itself (German: Kernstadt) and the outlying villages of Baumerlenbach, Büttelbronn, Cappel, Eckartsweiler, Michelbach am Wald, Möglingen, Ohrnberg, Schwöllbronn und Verrenberg, which were incorporated only in the regional reform of the 1970s. All unincorporated communities were part of the county from 1973 to Öhringen or its successor, the District of Hohenlohe.

The neighbourhoods are also places in the meaning of the Municipal Code of Baden-Württemberg with an Ortschaftsrat and a mayor as chairman. The village councils are elected at each municipal election of the voting-age population of the village and are important to hear matters concerning the village. Every town has a local administrative body of the municipality.

| Town subdivision | Incorporated | Population | Area (ha) | Areas included |
|---|---|---|---|---|
| Baumerlenbach | December 31, 1972 | 407 | 622 | – |
| Büttelbronn | December 31, 1973 | 515 | 694 | Ober- und Untermaßholderbach |
| Cappel | January 1, 1975 | 1163 | 230 | – |
| Eckartsweiler | January 1, 1975 | 353 | 754 | Platzhof, Untersöllbach, Weinsbach |
| Michelbach am Wald | December 31, 1972 | 1231 | 1321 | – |
| Möglingen | December 31, 1972 | 272 | 356 | – |
| Ohrnberg | December 31, 1972 | 624 | 785 | Buchhof, Heuholzhöfe, Neuenberg, Ruckhardshausen |
| Schwöllbronn | February 1, 1972 | 478 | 681 | Unterohrn |
| Verrenberg | February 1, 1972 | 680 | 414 | – |

=== Demographics ===
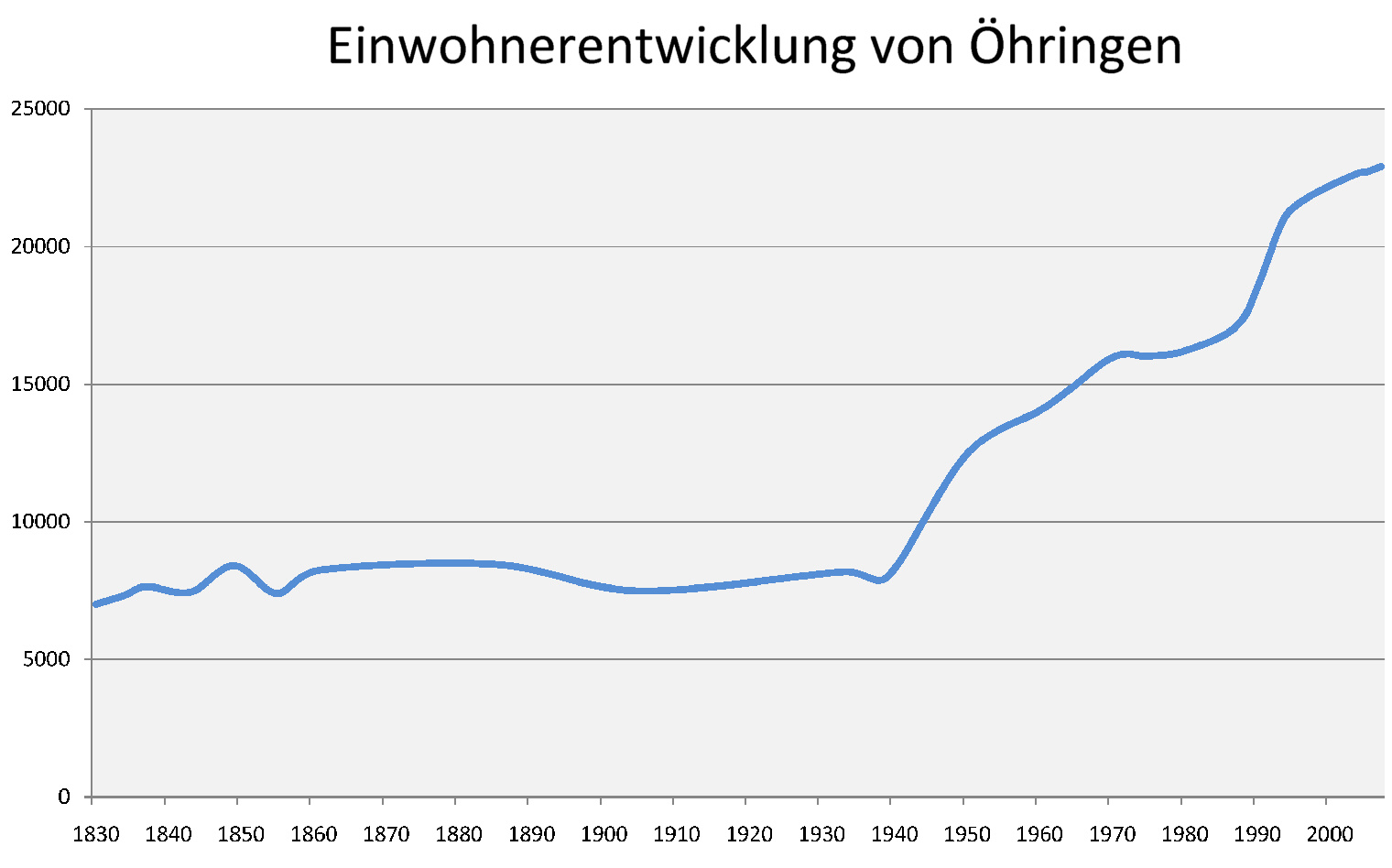
Number of inhabitants Öhringen with districts

| Year | Inhabitants |
|---|---|
| 1798 | 3,157 |
| 1810 | 3,419 |
| 1823 | 3,291 |
| 1843 | 3,235 |
| 1861 | 3,798 |
| 1 December 1871 | 3,412 |
| 1 December 1880 | 3,723 |
| 1 December 1890 | 3,914 |
| 1 December 1900 | 3,570 |
| 1 December 1910 | 3,801 |
| 16 June 1925 | 4,208 |
| 16 June 1933 | 4,618 |
| 17 May 1939 | 4,582 |

| Year | Inhabitants |
|---|---|
| December 1945 | 5,858 |
| 13 September 1950 | 7,475 |
| 6 June 1961 | 10,050 |
| 27 May 1970 | 11,367 |
| 31 December 1975 | 16,011 |
| 31 December 1980 | 16,211 |
| 27 May 1987 | 16,942 |
| 31 December 1990 | 18,535 |
| 31 December 1993 | 20,623 |
| 31 December 1995 | 21,433 |
| 31 December 2000 | 22,208 |
| 31 December 2005 | 22,706 |
| 30 June 2007 | 22,913 |

== Mayors ==
- 1887–1906: Schäufele (was Stadtschultheiß in Kupferzell before)
- 1906–1918: Albert Meyder
- 1919–1945: Peter Berner
- 1945–1948: Wilhelm Rösch
- 1948–1954: Franz Illenberger
- 1954–1967: Richard Laidig
- 1967–1987: Ulrich Fahrenbruch
- 1987–2009: Jochen K. Kübler
- 2009–2025: Thilo Michler
- Since 2025: Patrick Wegener

The mayor is Patrick Wegener (SPD).

== Culture and sightseeing ==
=== Museums ===
- The Weygang Museum is a museum of local history, with a tin and faience collection from the Roman era.
- The Museum Werkstatt Pflaumer gives one a chance to take a look at the locksmith and grinding professions.
- The Meeres (Sea) Museum (in Cappel) – gives the viewer a chance to look at the most beautiful mussels and snail shells from seas all over the world.

=== Architecture ===
The Medieval marketplace is the heart of the town. Here stands the castle of Hohenlohe (German: Schloss), the attraction of the town, which is now used as the Town Hall. Close by is the Protestant church (Stiftskirche).

Other churches in Öhringen include the Spitalkirche St. Anna und Elisabeth (now Protestant, built in 1376), the cemetery chapel of St. Anna (built in 1520, also Protestant), and the Catholic Church of St. Joseph (1961).

Other things to see in the centre of the town are Upper (Obere-) Gate (1792), the old Deanery, the guesthouse of the Roman Emperor, the Yellow Castle, and the Tierhofgarten (a large garden with zoo animals).

=== 2006 home of the Socceroos ===
During the 2006 FIFA World Cup, the Australia national soccer team, "The Socceroos" based their pre-game training in the town. The Socceroos trained at the stadium of local football club TSG Öhringen, whose pitch has been relaid at a cost of $335,000, and stayed at the five-star Wald-und-Schlosshotel, a former hunting lodge, in nearby Friedrichsruhe.

The Australians were given an official reception by Öhringen's Mayor, Jochen Kübler. "We are friends to the Australia team," he said. "We hope they will get more power from the region."

The team finished second in Brazil-dominated Group F, but fell in the Round of 16 against Italy by a controversial penalty in the final minutes of the match.

== Twin towns – sister cities ==
Öhringen is twinned with:

- Großenhain, Germany
- Kędzierzyn-Koźle, Poland
- Treffen am Ossiacher See, Austria

== Notable people ==
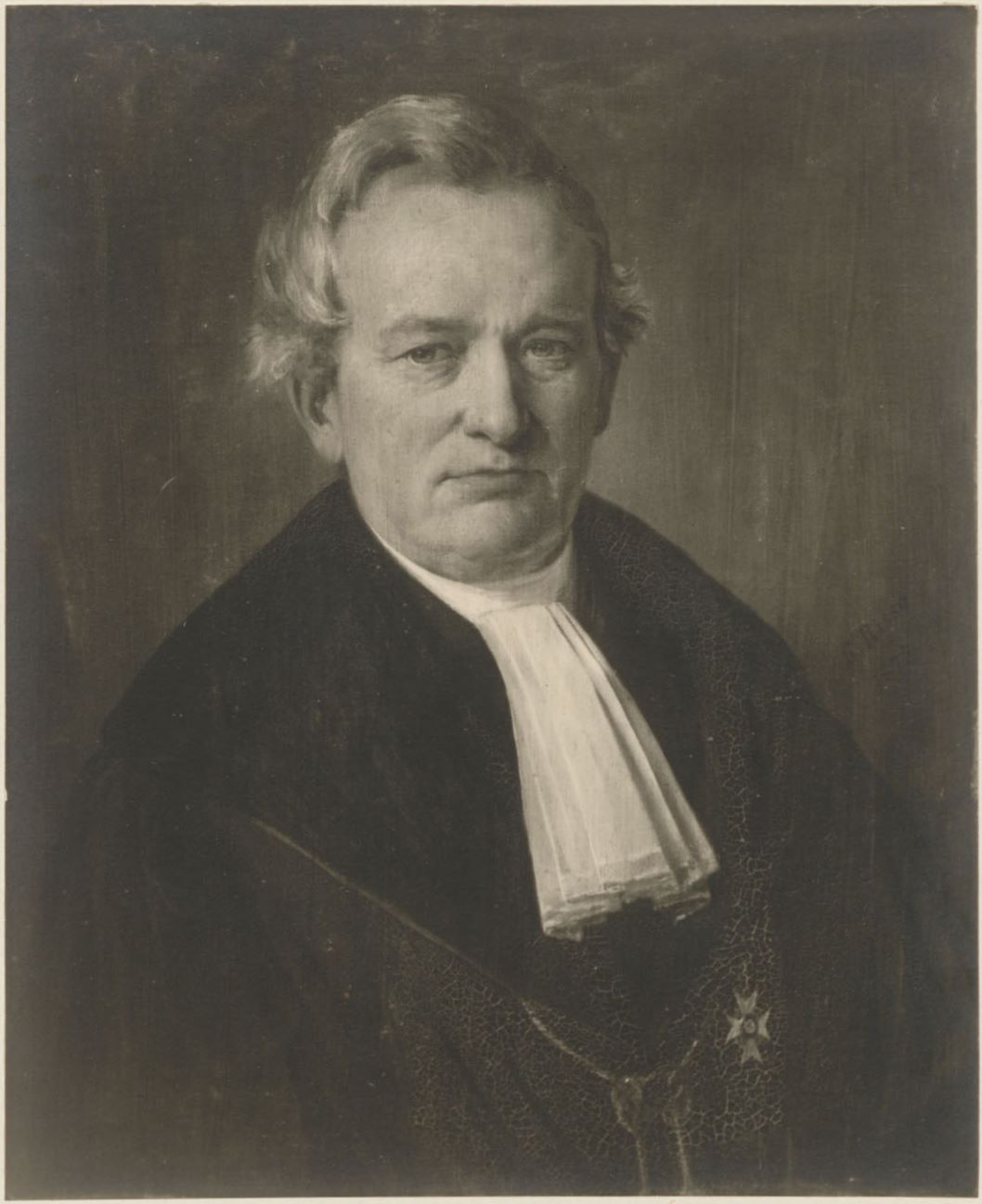
Karl Heinrich Weizsäcker

- Wendel Hipler (1465–1526), led the farmers' parliament in Heilbronn as a peasant chancellor
- Johann Ludwig Christ (1739–1813), naturalist, gardener and pastor.
- Johan Carl Krauss (1759–1826), professor of medicine, botanist, taxonomist and author of botanical books.
- Friedrich Christoph Dietrich (1779–1847), lithograph and copper cutcher
- Karl Heinrich Weizsäcker (1822–1899), Protestant theologian, chancellor of University of Tübingen.
- Julius Weizsäcker (1828–1889), historian specializing in medieval and early modern history.
- Karl Friedrich Schall (1859–1925), fine mechanic and co-founder of the company Cleaner, Gebbert & Schall in Erlangen
- Otto Röhm (1876–1939), pharmacist, developed one of the first polymethylmethacrylate and invented the brand Plexiglas
- Oswald Lutz (1876–1944), officer, most recently general of the Panzertruppe
- August Lösch (1906–1945), economist and social scientist
- Reinhold Würth (born 1935), entrepreneur of a screw bnusiness (Würth Group) and art collector.
- Hartmut Weber, (DE Wiki) (born 1945), historian and archivist, President of the German Federal Archives (1999–2011)
