= Carl Friedrich von Weizsäcker =

German physicist (1912–2007)

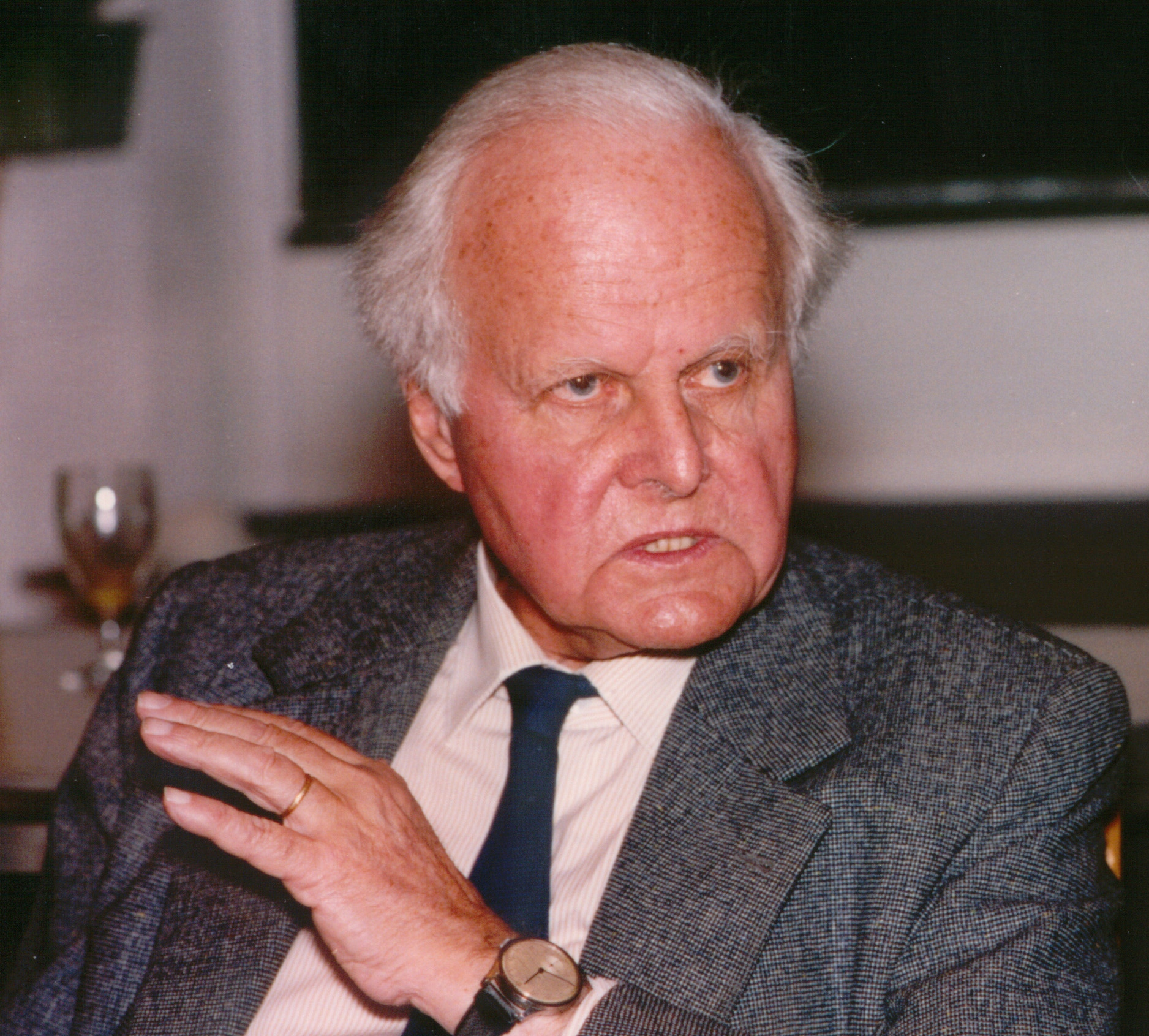
- Weizsäcker in 1993
- Born: Carl Friedrich Weizsäcker; 28 June 1912; Kiel, Schleswig-Holstein, German Empire
- Died: 28 April 2007 (aged 94); Starnberg, Bavaria, Germany
- Education: University of Göttingen; University of Leipzig
- Known for: Weizsäcker correction; Method of virtual quanta; Bethe–Weizsäcker formula; Bethe–Weizsäcker process; von Weizsäcker–Zeldovich problem
- Awards: Max Planck Medal (1957); Goethe Prize (1958); Pour le Mérite (1961); Templeton Prize (1989)
- Scientific career
- Fields: Physics, philosophy
- Workplaces: Max Planck Institute
- Doctoral advisor: Friedrich Hund
- Doctoral students: Karl-Heinz Höcker

Carl Friedrich Freiherr von Weizsäcker (German: [kaʁl ˈfʁiːdʁɪç fɔn ˈvaɪtsɛkɐ]; 28 June 1912 – 28 April 2007) was a German physicist and philosopher. He was the longest-living member of the team which performed nuclear research in Nazi Germany during the Second World War, under Werner Heisenberg's leadership. There is ongoing debate as to whether or not he and the other members of the team actively and willingly pursued the development of a nuclear bomb for Germany during this time.

A member of the prominent Weizsäcker family, he was son of the diplomat Ernst von Weizsäcker, elder brother of the former German President Richard von Weizsäcker, father of the physicist and environmental researcher Ernst Ulrich von Weizsäcker and father-in-law of the former General Secretary of the World Council of Churches Konrad Raiser.

Weizsäcker made important theoretical discoveries regarding energy production in stars from nuclear fusion processes. He also did influential theoretical work on planetary formation in the early Solar System.

In his late career, he focused more on philosophical, ethical and historical issues, and was awarded several international honours for his work in those areas.

== Early life and education ==
Born in Kiel, Schleswig-Holstein, he was the grandson of Karl Hugo von Weizsäcker, the Prime Minister of the Kingdom of Württemberg. His grandfather was ennobled in 1897 and raised to the hereditary nobility with the title of Baron (Freiherr) in 1916. As such, the four-year-old Carl Friedrich Weizsäcker became Baron Carl Friedrich von Weizsäcker. Since 1919, noble titles have legally been considered parts of the family name.

Weizsäcker was raised in Stuttgart, Basel and Copenhagen. Between 1929 and 1933 Weizsäcker studied physics, mathematics and astronomy in Berlin, Göttingen and Leipzig, supervised by and working with Heisenberg and Niels Bohr, among others. The supervisor of his doctoral thesis was Friedrich Hund.

== Work on nuclear fusion in the Sun ==
Weizsäcker's special interests as a young researcher were the nuclear processes in stars and the binding energy of atomic nuclei. Together with Hans Bethe he found a mechanism or pathway for the cyclic process of fusion in stars (Bethe–Weizsäcker process, published 1937–1939). This discovery should not be confused with his earlier (1935) development of the Bethe–Weizsäcker formula, or Semi-Empirical Mass Formula (SEMF), which was a theoretical formula relating the curve of nuclear binding energy, nuclear masses, and certain other nuclear properties.

== Work on planetary formation ==
In 1938, Weizsäcker developed a theory on the formation of the Solar System, based on considerations regarding the unequal share of lighter and heavier elements in the Sun and the Solar System's terrestrial planets. His views were later generally acknowledged and refined by a large number of other physicists and astronomers. According to the theory, the Sun and its planets evolved from a gas cloud made up of 99% hydrogen and helium, and 1% of heavier elements. Some 10% of the cloud remained around the Sun as an extensive atmosphere during an initial phase, and the 1% of heavier elements within this 10% of the total mass of the cloud would tally with the fraction of roughly 1% that the planets contribute to the mass of the Solar System today.

The theory also helped to explain the empirically observed regular pattern of increase in the diameters of the orbits of the planets of the Solar System, from inward to outward. This result was a natural outcome of the increasing size of "planetary eddies" of gas and dust farther from the centre of the early solar system.

A further implication of his theory was that many stars out in the universe, with characteristics similar to the Sun, would have to be expected to possess planetary systems similar to our own.

Shortly after the end of the Second World War in Europe, the Russian émigré American physicist George Gamow co-authored an influential paper supporting Weizsäcker's work on planetary formation in the early solar system.

== Work on atomic weapons ==
After nuclear fission became known in early 1939 through the work of Otto Hahn and Lise Meitner, Weizsäcker (and by his own estimate, 200 other physicists) quickly recognised that nuclear weapons could potentially be built. He discussed the upsetting implications in February 1939 with philosopher friend Georg Max Friedrich Valentin Picht (1913–1982).

During the Second World War, Weizsäcker joined the German nuclear weapons program, participating in efforts to construct an atomic bomb, while based at the Kaiser Wilhelm Institute in Berlin. As early as August 1939, Albert Einstein warned U.S. President Franklin D. Roosevelt about this research and highlighted that "the son of the German Under-Secretary of State, von Weizsäcker, is attached to the Kaiser-Wilhelm-Institut in Berlin where some of the American work on uranium is now being repeated."

As a protégé of Werner Heisenberg, Weizsäcker was present at a crucial meeting at the Army Ordnance headquarters in Berlin on 17 September 1939, at which the German atomic weapons program was launched. Early in the war — possibly until 1942 — he hoped a successful nuclear weapons project would earn him political influence. In July 1940 he was co-author of a report to the army on the possibility of "energy production" from refined uranium. The report also predicted the possibility of using plutonium for the same purpose including the production of a new type of explosives. During summer 1942 Weizsäcker filed a patent on a transportable "process to generate energy and neutrons by an explosion... e.g. a bomb". The patent application was found in the 1990s in Moscow.

Historians have been divided as to whether Heisenberg and his team were sincerely trying to construct a nuclear weapon, or whether their failure reflected a desire not to succeed because they did not want the Nazi regime to have such a weapon. This latter view, largely based on postwar interviews with Heisenberg and Weizsäcker, was put forward by Robert Jungk in his 1957 book Brighter Than a Thousand Suns. In a 1957 interview with the German weekly Der Spiegel, Weizsäcker frankly admitted to the scientific ambitions of those years "We wanted to know if chain reactions were possible. No matter what we would end up doing with our knowledge – we wanted to know." Only by "divine grace", Weizsäcker said, were they spared the temptation to build the bomb as the German war economy was unable to mobilize the necessary resources.

Original sources about this question were not revealed until 1993, when transcripts of secretly recorded conversations among ten top German physicists, including Heisenberg and Weizsäcker, detained under Operation Epsilon at Farm Hall, near Cambridge in late 1945, were published. In the conversation after the group of detainees had listened to the BBC Radio news on dropping of the atomic bomb on 6 August 1945, Weizsäcker said: "I believe the reason we didn't do it was because all the physicists didn't want to do it, on principle. If we had wanted Germany to win the war we would have succeeded!"

But the "Farm Hall Transcripts" also revealed that Weizsäcker had taken the lead in arguing for an agreement among the scientists that they would claim that they had never wanted to develop a German nuclear weapon. It was this version of events which was given to Jungk as the basis of his book. This story was untrue at least to the extent that the detainees also included scientists actively engaged in eager attempts to build a nuclear bomb, namely Kurt Diebner and Walther Gerlach. Max von Laue later called this agreement "die Lesart" (the Version). Although the memorandum which the scientists drew up was drafted by Heisenberg, von Laue wrote: "The leader in all these discussions was Weizsäcker. I did not hear any mention of any ethical point of view."

Weizsäcker himself stated that Heisenberg, Karl Wirtz and he had a private agreement to study nuclear fission to the fullest possible extent in order to "decide" themselves how to proceed with its technical application. "There was no conspiracy, not even in our small three-man-circle, with certainty not to make the bomb. Just as little, there was no passion to make the bomb..." In a recent report based on additional documents from Russian archives, historian Mark Walker concludes that "in comparison with Diebner [and] Gerlach ... Heisenberg and finally Weizsäcker did obviously not use all power they commanded to provide the National Socialists with nuclear weapons".

However, historian of science and technology Wolf Schäfer has concluded, that Weizsäcker did want to build the bomb for Hitler. In a detailed study about Weizsäcker’s contributions to both Nazi Germany and West Germany, he distinguished between the young and the older (pacifistic) Weizsäcker, that is, the person he was from 1939 to 1945, and the person he became thereafter.

The young von Weizsäcker was no clairvoyant; he expected a German victory and wanted to offer Hitler the superweapon to guarantee Germany's supremacy, not to prevent the dictator's suicide and the devastation of the country. What von Weizsäcker foresaw in 1941 was Germany's emergence as the world's first nuclear power. The highly talented Hitler would jump at this, he thought. The power of the atomic bomb would enable the dictator, who had already conquered Western Europe, to keep the "Anglo-Saxons" in check (USA), or rather bring them to their knees (Great Britain), and to colonize Russia. We can assume that the policy of peace, which the young von Weizsäcker wanted to discuss with Hitler, was the reorganization of Europe under German domination.

Ivan Supek (one of Heisenberg's students and friends) claimed that Weizsäcker was the main figure behind the famous and controversial Heisenberg–Bohr meeting in Copenhagen in September 1941. Allegedly, he tried to persuade Bohr to mediate for peace between Germany and Great Britain. According to Weizsäcker's own account, he had persuaded Heisenberg to meet Bohr in order to broker an accord of the international nuclear physicist "community" not to build the bomb. However, according to Bohr's (posthumously published) account of the events, Heisenberg enthusiastically promoted the prospect of German victory and wanted Bohr and his colleagues to assist in the German atomic program.

Later during the war Weizsäcker worked as a professor at the Reichsuniversität Straßburg. The American capture of his laboratory and papers there in December 1944 revealed to the Western Allies that the Germans had not come close to developing a nuclear weapon.

== Post-war career ==
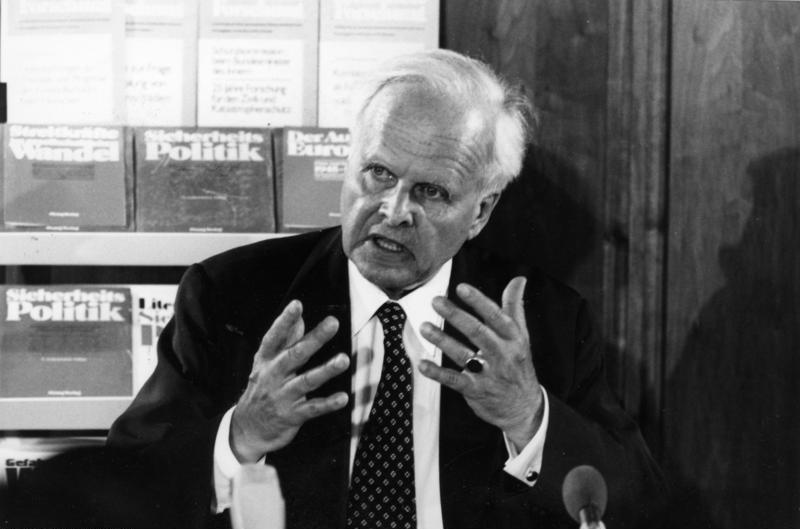
Von Weizsäcker in 1983

Weizsäcker was allowed to return to the part of Germany administered by the Western Allies in 1946, and became director of a department for theoretical physics in the Max Planck Institute for Physics in Göttingen. In 1952, he became the first director of the IFT (Institute of Theoretical Physics) in São Paulo which would later become part of UNESP. From 1957 to 1969, Weizsäcker was professor of philosophy at the University of Hamburg. In 1957 he won the Max Planck medal. In 1970 he formulated a "Weltinnenpolitik" (world internal policy). From 1970 to 1980, he was head of the Max Planck Institute for the Research of Living Conditions in the Modern World in Starnberg (jointly with Jürgen Habermas). He researched and published on the danger of nuclear war, what he saw as the conflict between the First World and the Third World, and the consequences of environmental degradation.

He was one of the eight signatories of the Memorandum of Tübingen which called for the recognition of the Oder–Neiße line as the official border between Germany and Poland and spoke against a possible nuclear armament of West Germany.

In the 1970s he founded, together with the Indian philosopher Pandit Gopi Krishna, a research foundation "for western sciences and eastern wisdom". After his retirement in 1980 he became a Christian pacifist, and intensified his work on the conceptual definition of quantum physics, particularly on the Copenhagen interpretation.

His experiences in the Nazi era, and with his own behavior in that time, gave Weizsäcker an interest in questions of ethics and responsibility. In 1957, he was one of the Göttinger 18, a group of prominent German physicists who protested against the idea that the Bundeswehr (West German armed forces) should be equipped with tactical nuclear weapons. He further suggested that West Germany should declare its definitive abdication of all kinds of nuclear weapons.

In 2007, Weizsäcker died at the age of 94 in Söcking near Starnberg. Opinions are split on the question of whether he accepted his share of responsibility for the German scientific community's efforts to build a nuclear weapon for Nazi Germany. Schäfer documented Weizsäcker’s lifelong connection with the philosopher Martin Heidegger and has argued that he shared the philosopher’s hope for an “utopian” National Socialism.

== Theory of ur-alternatives ==
Weizsäcker developed the theory of ur-alternatives (archetypal objects), publicized in his book Einheit der Natur (published in English as The Unity of Nature) and further developed through the 1990s. The theory axiomatically constructs quantum physics from the distinction between empirically observable, binary alternatives. Weizsäcker used his theory to derive the 3-dimensionality of space and to estimate the entropy of a proton falling into a black hole.

== Awards and honours ==
- 1957 Max Planck Medal
- 1958 Goethe Prize of the city of Frankfurt am Main
- 1961 Pour le Mérite for Science and Art
- 1963 Peace Prize of the German Book Trade
- 1969 Erasmus Prize of the city of Herdam
- 1969 Austrian Medal for Science and Art
- 1973 Grand Merit Cross with Star and Sash of the Federal Republic of Germany
- 1982 Ernst Hellmut Vits Prize of the University of Münster
- 1983 Heinrich Heine Prize of the city of Düsseldorf
- 1988 Sigmund Freud Prize for Scientific Prose
- 1989 Templeton Prize for "Progress in Religion"
- 1989 Theodor Heuss Prize "for his world-renowned, diverse and dedicated contributions to humanity themes: peace – justice – Integrity of Creation"
- Prix Arnold Reymond (University of Lausanne)
- Hanseatic Goethe Prize
- Karl IV Prize of the City and University of Prague

Honorary degrees
Law: Free University of Amsterdam, University of Alberta, University of Aberdeen
Theology: University of Tübingen, University of Basel
Science: Karl Marx University, Leipzig
Philosophy: Technische Universität Berlin, University of Aachen

Memberships
Max Planck Society for the Advancement of Sciences
German Academy of Sciences Leopoldina
Göttingen Academy of Sciences
Saxon Academy of Sciences
Austrian Academy of Sciences
Bavarian Academy of Sciences
Bavarian Academy of Fine Arts
German Physical Society
Académie des Sciences Morales et Politiques
American Physical Society
Croatian Academy of Sciences and Arts
German Academy for Language and Literature
Joachim Jungius Society of Science
Hamburg Institute for Human Sciences

The Carl Friedrich von Weizsäcker Gymnasium school was named after him, in the town of Barmstedt, Schleswig-Holstein.

Weizsäcker was nominated four times for the Nobel Prize in Physics. Since 2009, the Donors' Association for German Science and the Leopoldina makes a biennial award of €50,000 "Carl Friedrich von Weizsäcker Award" for "outstanding scientific contribution to resolving socially important problems". There is a Carl-Friedrich von Weizsäcker Foundation, knowledge and responsibility – Carl Friedrich von Weizsäcker-Gesellschaft eV.

== Works ==
- Zum Weltbild der Physik, Leipzig 1946 (ISBN 3-7776-1209-X), 2002, 14th edition, renewed and with introduction by Holger Lyre de:Holger Lyre
  - translation into English by Marjorie Grene The World View of Physics, London, 1952
  - translation into French Le Monde vu par la Physique, Paris 1956
- Die Geschichte der Natur, Göttingen 1948 (ISBN 3-7776-1398-3)
- Die Einheit der Natur, Munich 1971 (ISBN 3-423-33083-X)
  - translation The Unity of Nature, New York, 1980 (ISBN 0-374-28100-9)
- Wege in der Gefahr, Munich 1976
  - translation The Politics of Peril, New York 1978
- Der Garten des Menschlichen, Munich 1977 (ISBN 3-446-12423-3)
  - translation The Ambivalence of progress, essays on historical anthropology, New York 1988 (ISBN 0-913729-92-2)
- Deutlichkeit: Beiträge zu politischen und religiösen Gegenwartsfragen, Hanser, München, 1978, 1979 (ISBN 3-446-12623-6).
- The Biological Basis of Religion and Genius, Gopi Krishna, New York, intro. by Carl Friedrich von Weizsäcker, which is half the book, 1971, 1972 (ISBN 0-06-064788-4)
- Aufbau der Physik, Munich 1985 (ISBN 3-446-14142-1)
  - translation The Structure of Physics, Heidelberg 2006 (ISBN 1-4020-5234-0; ISBN 978-1-4020-5234-7)
- Der Mensch in seiner Geschichte, Munich 1991 (ISBN 3-446-16361-1)
- Zeit und Wissen, Munich 1992 (ISBN 3-446-16367-0)
- Der bedrohte Friede, 1994 (ISBN 3-446-13454-9)
- Große Physiker, Munich 1999 (ISBN 3-446-18772-3)

== See also ==
- Bethe–Weizsäcker cycle or CNO cycle
- Liquid drop model
- The Heavy Water War
