= Karl von Weizsäcker =

German politician

Karl von Weizsäcker Freiherr von Weizsäcker
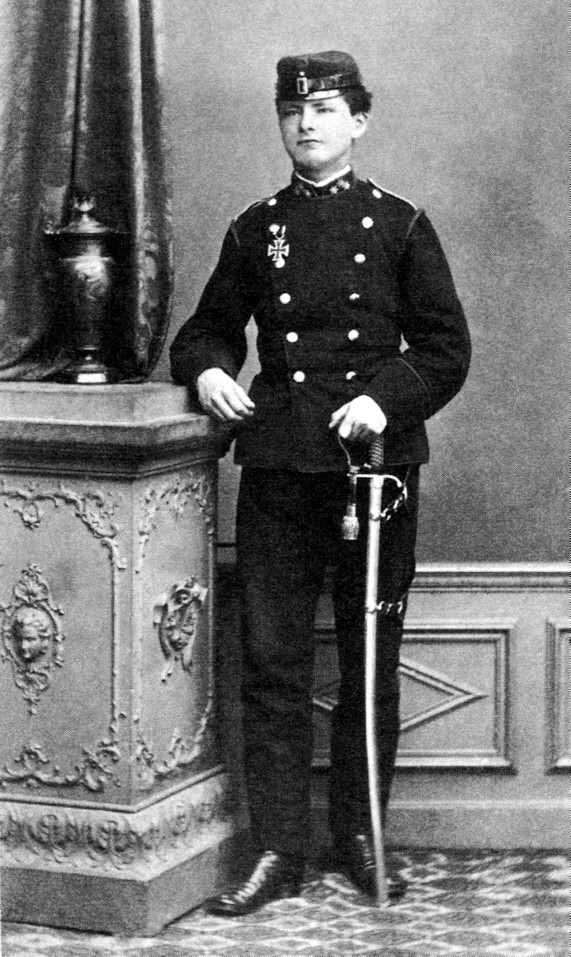
- Weizsäcker as an ensign, 1871

Minister-President of the Kingdom of Württemberg
- In office 1906–1918
- Monarch: William II
- Preceded by: Wilhelm August von Breitling
- Succeeded by: Theodor Liesching

Personal details
- Born: Karl Hugo von Weizsäcker; 25 February 1853 Stuttgart, Kingdom of Württemberg
- Died: 2 February 1926 (aged 72) Stuttgart, Free People's State of Württemberg, Weimar Republic
- Spouse: Paula von Meibom
- Relations: Carl Friedrich von Weizsäcker (grandson); Richard von Weizsäcker (grandson)
- Children: Ernst von Weizsäcker
- Parent(s): Karl Heinrich Weizsäcker; Auguste Sophie Christiane Dahm
- Education: University of Tübingen

Karl Hugo Freiherr von Weizsäcker (25 February 1853 – 2 February 1926) was a German politician who served as Prime Minister of the Kingdom of Württemberg, and a member of the prominent Weizsäcker family.

== Early life ==
He was born Karl Hugo Weizsäcker in Stuttgart, the son of the theologian Karl Heinrich Weizsäcker and his wife, the former Auguste Sophie Christiane Dahm. While serving as a politician at the court of the Kingdom of Württemberg, his family was raised to nobility as von Weizsäcker.

Weizsäcker studied at the University of Tübingen.

== Career ==
While serving in the administration of King William II of Württemberg, he was raised to the nobility on 24 February 1897.

From 1900 onwards, he served as Minister of Culture — until 4 December 1906 when he was made Prime Minister. He served in this office until 6 November 1918, shortly before the monarchy was abolished in the German Revolution of 1918–1919.

In 1916, he and his family were raised to the hereditary noble title of Baron (Freiherr).

== Personal life ==
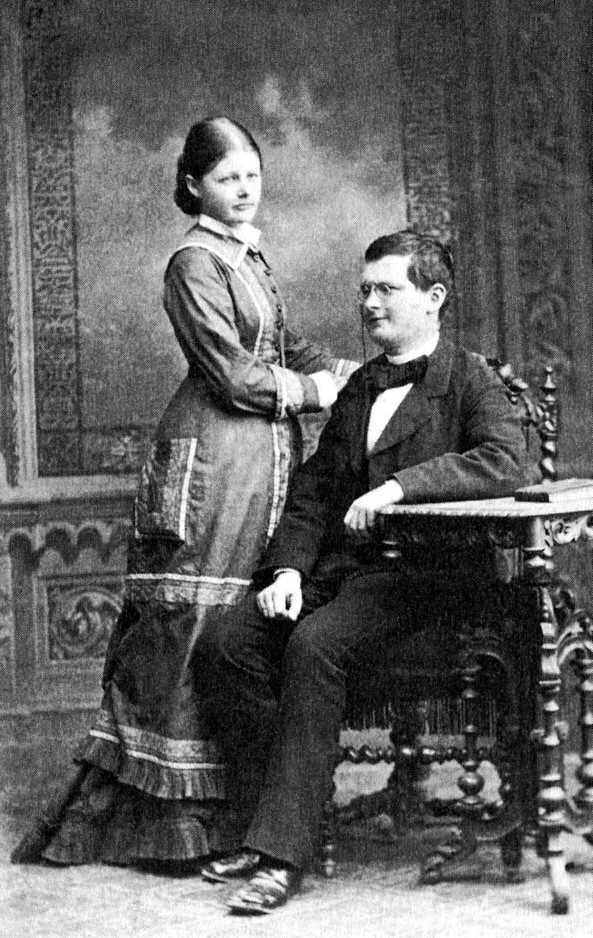
Karl and his wife, Paula, 1880

Weizsäcker was married to Paula von Meibom. They were the parents of Ernst von Weizsäcker (1882–1951), Ambassador to the Holy See.

Weizsäcker died in Stuttgart in 1926.

=== Descendants ===
Through his son Ernst, he was a grandfather of the physicist Carl Friedrich von Weizsäcker and of Richard von Weizsäcker, who was President of Germany from 1984 to 1994.
