= Karl Heinrich Weizsäcker =

German Protestant theologian (1822–1899)

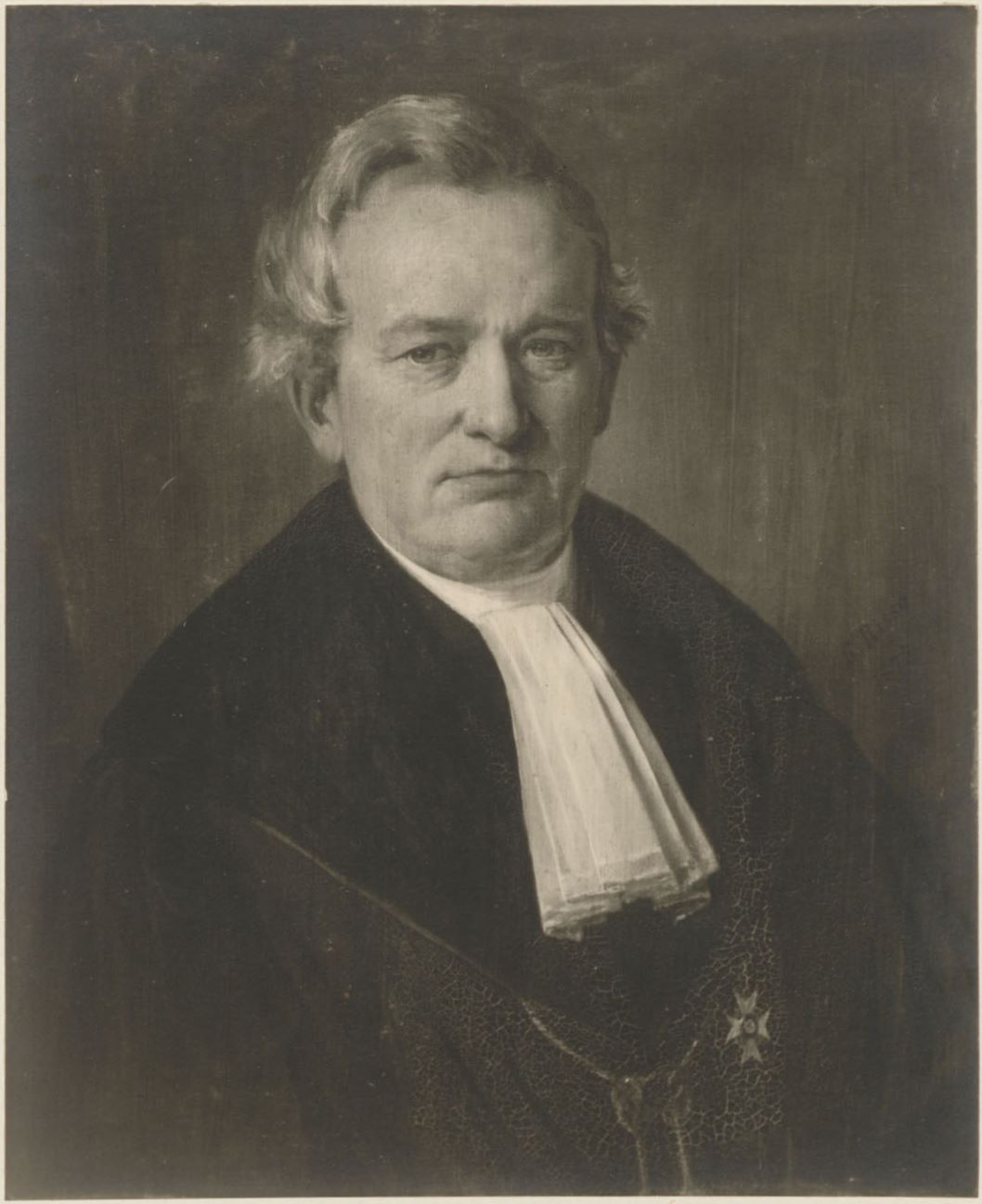
Karl Heinrich Weizsäcker

Karl Heinrich Weizsäcker (11 December 1822 – 13 August 1899) was a German Protestant theologian.

== Life and work ==
Weizsäcker was born in Öhringen near Heilbronn in Württemberg, the son of Sophie (Rößle) and Christian Ludwig Friedrich Weizsäcker. He studied at Tübingen and Berlin.

After studying at the University of Tübingen and the Frederick William University of Berlin, he became Privatdozent at Tübingen in 1847 and professor of ecclesiastical history and the history of dogma in 1861.

From 1856 to 1878 he helped to edit the Jahrbücher für deutsche Theologie, and his elaborate studies Untersuchungen über die evangelische Geschichte, ihre Quellen und den Gang ihrer Entwicklung (Investigations in the history of the evangelical church, its sources, and its course of development, 1864) and Das apostolische Zeitalter der christlichen Kirche (The Christian Church in the time of the apostles, 1886; Engl. trans. 1894–1895; 3rd edition Leipzig and Tübingen: Mohr, 1901) made him widely known and respected. Weizsäcker's other works include Zur Kritik des Barnabas-Briefs (1863) and Ferdinand Christian Baur (1892).

In 1861 he succeeded Ferdinand Christian Baur as professor for history of church and dogma at Tübingen. Later, he became chancellor of the university.

Weizsäcker was a New Testament critic, and the editor of a theological journal, and distinguished for his learning and lucid style.

He died in Tübingen in 1899.

== Family ==
In 1848, he married Auguste Sophie Dahm (1824–1884), with whom he had three children:

- Sophie (1850 – after 1910), married in 1875 Adolf von Bilfinger (1846-1902)
- Karl von Weizsäcker (1853–1926), prime minister in the Kingdom of William II of Württemberg
- Marie (1857–1939), married in 1875 Paul von Bruns (1846–1916), surgeon
