= Würth (surname) =

Würth is a surname, and may refer to:

- Adolf Würth (1909–1954), German businessman
- Benedikt Würth (born 1968), Swiss politician
- Bettina Würth (born 1961), granddaughter of Adolf Würth
- Felix Würth (1923–2014), Austrian long and triple jumper
- Giorgia Würth (born 1981), Italian actress, television presenter and writer
- Johann Joseph Würth (1706–1767), Austrian silversmith
- Julian Wuerth, American philosopher
- Reinhold Würth (born 1935), German businessman and art collector, son of Adolf Würth
- Svenja Würth (born 1993), German Nordic combined skier and ski jumper
- Tara Würth (born 2002), Croatian tennis player

== See also ==
- Würth, German industrial wholesaler
- Wurth, surname
