= Christian von Stetten =

German businessman and politician

Christian von Stetten MdB
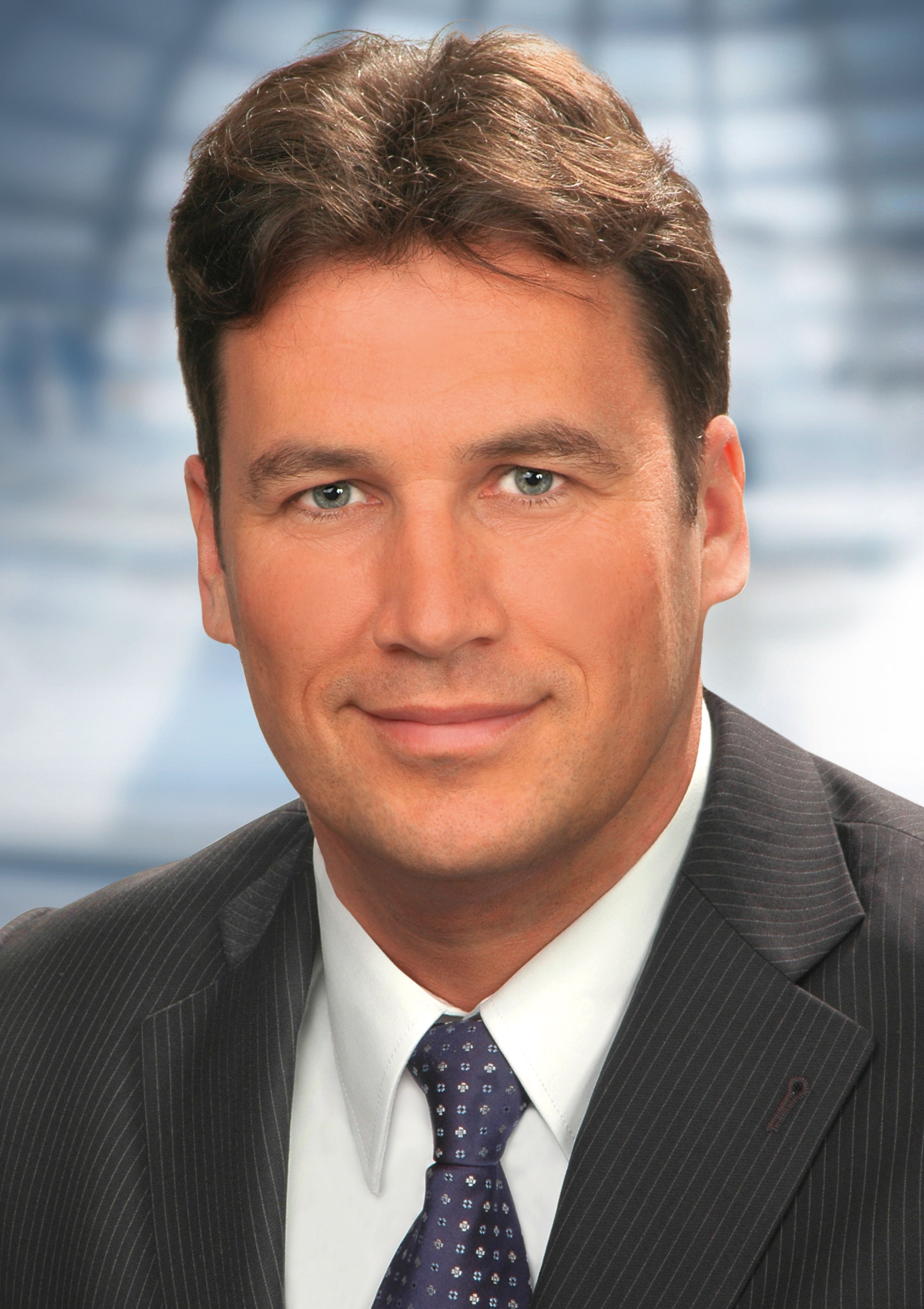

Member of the Bundestag; for Schwäbisch Hall – Hohenlohe
- Incumbent
- Assumed office 17 October 2002
- Preceded by: Wolfgang von Stetten

Personal details
- Born: 24 June 1970 (age 56) Stuttgart, West Germany
- Party: Christian Democratic Union
- Children: 2
- Parent: Wolfgang von Stetten (father)
- Education: University of Mannheim; Heilbronn University of Applied Sciences

Christian Freiherr von Stetten (born 24 July 1970) is a Swiss-German businessman and politician of the Christian Democratic Union of Germany (CDU). He has served as Member of the Parliament of Germany, the Bundestag, since 2002. He represents the constituency of Schwäbisch Hall-Hohenlohe, and succeeded his father Wolfgang von Stetten as the Member of Parliament from that constituency.

== Early life and career ==
Von Stetten was born in Stuttgart to a Swiss mother and a German father. After finishing high school and carrying out his military service, he studied Business Administration at the University of Mannheim and the Heilbronn University of the Applied Sciences and graduated with a master of business administration degree. In 1996, while still a university student, he founded his first business in the town of Künzelsau, Germany. The establishment of other companies followed later.

== Political career ==
Von Stetten was elected to the Bundestag, the federal German parliament, in the 2002 elections as the representative of the district of Schwaebisch Hall–Hohenlohe. He was re-elected in 2005, 2009, and 2013.

In parliament, Von Stetten has been particularly active as a financial expert. He has been a member of the Finance Committee since 2002. In this capacity, he was his parliamentary group's rapporteur on the inheritance tax. In addition, he served on the Committee for the Scrutiny of Elections, Immunity and the Rules of Procedure between 2005 and 2013.

Within his CDU/CSU parliamentary group, von Stetten serves as deputy chairman of the Group of Small and Medium-Sized Businesses (PKM).

In the negotiations to form a Grand Coalition of the Christian Democrats and the Social Democrats (SPD) following the 2013 federal elections, von Stetten was part of the CDU/CSU delegation in the working group on financial policy and the national budget, led by Wolfgang Schäuble and Olaf Scholz.

Since 2025, Von Stetten has been serving as chair of the German Parliament's Committee on Economic Affairs.

== Political positions ==
In light of the Greek government-debt crisis, Stetten stated in early 2012 that "a Greek exit from the euro zone would not be the end of the world." On 27 February 2015, he voted against the Merkel government’s proposal for a four-month extension of Greece's bailout; in doing so, he joined a record number of 29 rebels from the CDU/CSU parliamentary group who expressed skepticism about whether the Greek government under Prime Minister Alexis Tsipras could be trusted to deliver on its reform pledges. On 17 July, he voted against the government’s proposal to negotiate yet another bailout for Greece. Ahead of the final vote on Greece's third bailout plan in August 2015, Stetten stated that "a temporary Grexit remains the right solution."

Ahead of the Christian Democrats’ leadership election in 2018, von Stetten publicly endorsed Friedrich Merz to succeed Angela Merkel as the party's chair.

== Other activities ==
- Honorary Consul of the Maldives
- Association of German Foundations, Member of the Parliamentary Advisory Board
- Friedrich Kriwan Foundation, Member of the Board of Trustees
- Allianz Global Investors Deutschland, Member of the supervisory board (2009-2010)

== Personal life ==
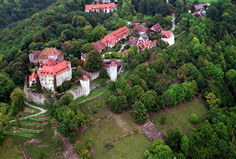
Castle Schloss Stetten from above

Stetten is a member of the noble Franconian Stetten family (de), who date back to 1098. His mother is Swiss, and he holds dual German and Swiss citizenship. He has a brother, Richard (born 1971), and a sister, Franziska (born 1977).

Political offices
Preceded by Wolfgang von Stetten	Member of Parliament for Schwäbisch Hall – Hohenlohe; 2002-	Succeeded by Incumbent
