= Würth Prize of Jeunesses Musicales Germany =

German music award

- Awarded for: artists, ensembles or projects who implement JMD's values and objectives in an exemplary manner
- Location: Künzelsau
- Country: Germany
- Presented by: Jeunesses Musicales Germany, Würth
- Hosted by: Würth
- Reward: €25,000
- First award: 1991

The Würth Prize of Jeunesses Musicales Germany (German: Würth-Preis der Jeunesses Musicales Deutschland) has been awarded since 1991 to artists, ensembles or projects who implement Jeunesses Musicales Germany's (JMD) values and objectives in an exemplary manner. Together with the Würth Foundation, the JMD has been honoring individual personalities, ensembles and projects every year. The prize is presented in Künzelsau and endowed with 25,000 euros (As of 2022). The jury is made up of representatives from the Würth Foundation and Jeunesses Musicales Germany and is advised by the Deutscher Musikrat (German Music Council). The JMD is the German section of the Jeunesses Musicales International (JMI). It was founded during the Second World War to encourage encounters between young musicians.

== Recipients ==
- 1991 – Dennis Russell Davies
- 1992 – Arcis Quintet
- 1993 – Philip Glass
- 1994 – Nicaragua project of Dietmar Schönherr "Casa de los tres Mundos"
- 1995 – Tölzer Knabenchor, Poznań Nightingales, Kühn Children's Choir Prague
- 1996 – Yakov Kreizberg
- 1997 – Junge Deutsche Philharmonie
- 1998 – Henry W. Meyer
- 1999 – Tabea Zimmermann
- 2000 – National Children's Orchestra of Venezuela
- 2001 – Claudio Abbado
- 2002 – Ensemble Resonanz
- 2003 – Theo Geißler
- 2004 – Education Programm of the Berlin Philharmonic
- 2005 – Philharmonie der Nationen
- 2006 – Michael Kaufmann
- 2007 – Artemis Quartet
- 2008 – Gustavo Dudamel
- 2009 – Arab-Jewish Youth Orchestra Israel
- 2010 – Martin Grubinger
- 2011 – Bundesjugendorchester
- 2012 – Sol Gabetta
- 2013 – Bruno Weil
- 2014 – Deutsche Kammerphilharmonie Bremen
- 2015 – vision string quartet
- 2016 – Lars Vogt
- 2017 – Christian Tetzlaff
- 2018 – STEGREIF.orchester Stuttgart
- 2019 – Patricia Kopatchinskaja
- 2020 – Junge Norddeutsche Philharmonie
- 2021 – Jörg Widmann
- 2022 – Notos Quartet
- 2023 – Deutsche Streicherphilharmonie
- 2024 – Mirga Gražinytė-Tyla
- 2025 – International Youth Symphony Orchestra Bremen
- 2026 – Nicolás Pasquet
