= Vibrant Curiosity =

Motor ship built in 2009

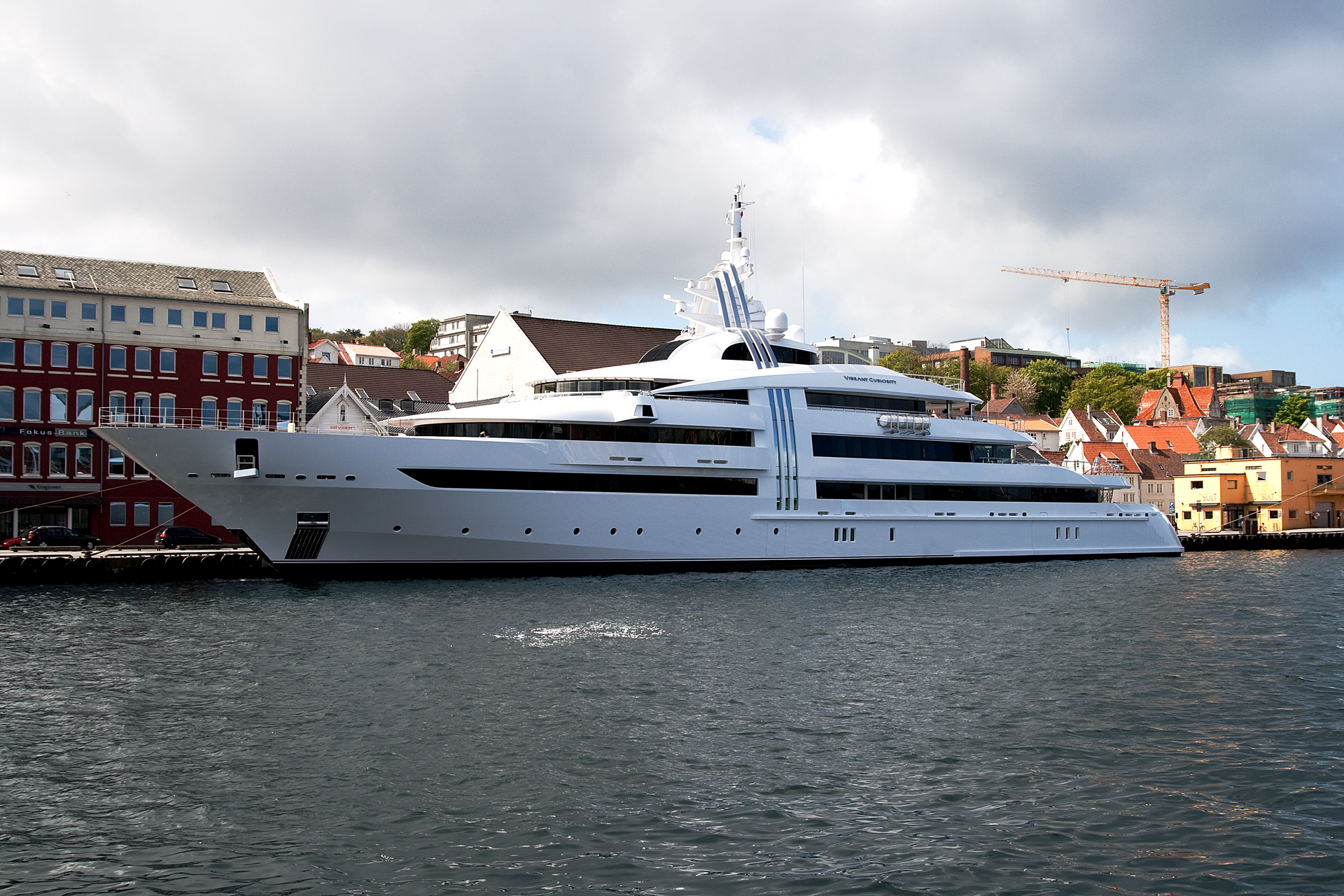
- "Vibrant Curiosity" in 2009

History

Malta
- Name: Vibrant Curiosity
- Owner: Reinhold Würth
- Port of registry: Malta
- Builder: Oceanco Yachts
- Yard number: Y704
- Launched: 2009
- In service: 2009-Present
- Identification: IMO number: 1010002; MMSI number: 235068366; International callsign: 2BQE2
- Status: Active

General characteristics
- Class & type: LR
- Type: Megayacht
- Tonnage: 2,822 GT
- Length: 85.47 m (280 ft 5 in)ft)
- Beam: 14.2 m (47 ft)
- Draught: 4.0 m (13.1 ft)
- Installed power: 2 × 4,680 shaft horsepower (3,490 kW)
- Propulsion: 2 × MTU 16V 595 TE 70
- Speed: 20 knots (37 km/h; 23 mph)
- Range: 5,500 miles (8,900 km; 4,800 nmi) at 14 knots
- Capacity: 14 passengers
- Crew: 26 crew

Vibrant Curiosity is a megayacht, owned by German entrepreneur Reinhold Würth. Her accommodation provisions include a master stateroom with its own office and private exterior deck area with whirlpool, one VIP suite with his & her bathroom, five double suites, two of which occupy the uppermost deck, and two further double guest cabins. The full-displacement superyacht has a flared bow and a 14.20m beam with exterior and interior design by the Italian team of Nuvolari & Lenard. The yacht has a crew of 26. It is capable of a top speed of 20 knots, a cruising speed of 17 knots, and a range of 5,500 nautical miles at 14 knots. A helicopter and helipad are located on the top deck.

The yacht gets its name from Wurth company's motto in the 2006/2007 business year.

== Development ==
The name Vibrant Curiosity was the motto of the Würth company in the business year 2006/2007. The yacht is designed by the Italian design team Nuvolari & Lenard and built by Oceanco in the Dutch town of Alblasserdam. The yacht can accommodate 14 guests and up to 26 crew. The motoryacht was launched in April 2009.

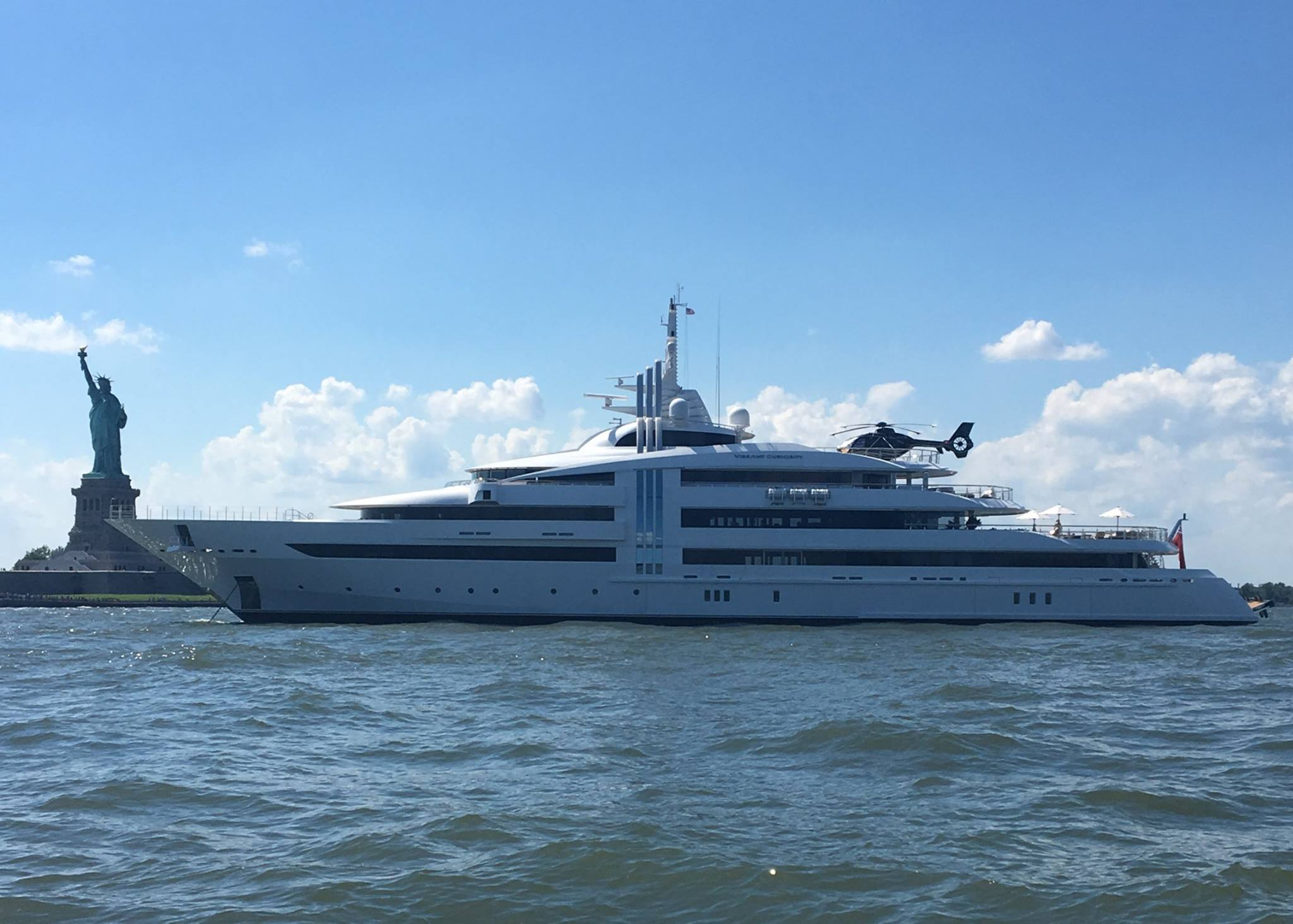
Vibrant Curiosity north of the Statue of Liberty, July 2017

== Engines ==
The main engines are 2 MTU 16V 595 TE70 diesel engines with power of 3492 kW. The yacht can reach a maximum speed of 18.5 knots (34.3 km/h), while the cruising speed is 15.0 knots (27.8 km/h). The ship's range, with a fuel capacity of 285.000 litres, is 5500 miles at a speed of 14 knots.

== See also ==
- List of yachts built by Oceanco
