= Wolfgang von Stetten =

German politician (born 1941)

Member of the Bundestag; for Schwäbisch Hall – Hohenlohe
- In office 20 December 1990 – 17 October 2002
- Preceded by: Philipp Jenninger
- Succeeded by: Christian von Stetten

Personal details
- Born: 22 January 1941 (age 85) Dresden, Germany
- Party: Christian Democratic Union
- Children: 3, including Christian
- Education: University of Cologne; University of Würzburg; Speyer University

Wolfgang Freiherr von Stetten (born 22 January 1941) is a German lawyer and politician of the Christian Democratic Union of Germany (CDU). He served as Member of Parliament (the Bundestag) from 1990 to 2002. He represented the constituency of Schwäbisch Hall – Hohenlohe, and was succeeded by his son Christian von Stetten.

== Early life and education ==
Wolfgang von Stetten was born in Niederwartha, now part of Cossebaude district of Dresden, to a father that was KIA as pilot in the Battle of Crete later the same year. He earned a doctorate in law in 1972, with the dissertation Die Rechtsstellung der freien unmittelbaren Reichsritterschaft, ihre Mediatisierung und ihre Stellung in den neuen Landen. From 1974 to 1984, he was a judge, and from 1984 to 1991, he served as Professor of Law at Heilbronn College. He is a member of the noble Franconian Stetten family, and owns his family seat, Schloss Stetten, in Künzelsau.

== Political career ==
As a member of parliament, von Stetten served on the Committee on Legal Affairs and as CDU/CSU spokesman for several years. He founded the German-Baltic Parliamentary Association in 1991 and served as its chair to 2002. The association supported the independence of the Baltic countries from the Soviet Union, and their membership in NATO and the European Union. From 1997 to 2001, he served as President of Studienzentrum Weikersheim. He has been the Lithuanian Consul in Baden-Württemberg since 2004. He is also an active member of several charitable societies.

In the debate about the outlawing of marital rape in Germany von Stetten stated: "Marriage is a sexual union and in principle obliges to have conjugal intercourse. Refusal from the beginning may be grounds for annulment, later refusal grounds for divorce. Part of married life is also to overcome the partner's unwillingness. The husband is not out to commit a crime - some men are simply more brutal."

== Honours ==
- 1989 Freiherr-vom-Stein-Medaille
- 1990 Federal Cross of Merit
- 1996 Lithuanian Order of Gedimino
- 1996 Estonian Order of the Cross of Terra Mariana First Class
- 2002 Latvian Order of the Three Stars Third Class
- 2003 Honorary citizen of Kelme, Lithuania

Political offices
| Preceded by Philipp Jenninger | Member of Parliament for Schwäbisch Hall – Hohenlohe; 1990-2002 | Succeeded by Christian von Stetten |
