= Schwäbisch Hall – Hohenlohe =

Federal electoral district of Germany

268 Schwäbisch Hall – Hohenlohe
- Electoral district for the Bundestag
- Schwäbisch Hall – Hohenlohe in 2025
- State: Baden-Württemberg
- Population: 309,400 (2019)
- Electorate: 225,874 (2021)
- Major settlements: Schwäbisch Hall; Crailsheim; Öhringen
- Area: 2,260.8 km^{2}

Current electoral district
- Created: 1980
- Party: CDU
- Member: Christian von Stetten
- Elected: 2002, 2005, 2009, 2013, 2017, 2021, 2025

Schwäbisch Hall – Hohenlohe is an electoral constituency (German: Wahlkreis) represented in the Bundestag. It elects one member via first-past-the-post voting. Under the current constituency numbering system, it is designated as constituency 268. It is located in northeastern Baden-Württemberg, comprising the districts of Hohenlohekreis and Schwäbisch Hall.

Schwäbisch Hall – Hohenlohe was created for the 1980 federal election. Since 2002, it has been represented by Christian von Stetten of the Christian Democratic Union (CDU).

== Geography ==
Schwäbisch Hall – Hohenlohe is located in northeastern Baden-Württemberg. As of the 2021 federal election, it comprises the districts of Hohenlohekreis and Schwäbisch Hall.

== History ==
Schwäbisch Hall – Hohenlohe was created in 1980, then known as Schwäbisch Hall. It acquired its current name in the 1994 election. In the 1980 through 1998 elections, it was constituency 172 in the numbering system. In the 2002 and 2005 elections, it was number 269. Since the 2009 election, it has been number 268. Its borders have not changed since its creation.

Election	No.	Name	Borders
1980	172	Schwäbisch Hall – Hohenlohe	Hohenlohekreis district; Schwäbisch Hall district
1983	172	Schwäbisch Hall – Hohenlohe	Hohenlohekreis district; Schwäbisch Hall district
1987	172	Schwäbisch Hall – Hohenlohe	Hohenlohekreis district; Schwäbisch Hall district
1990	172	Schwäbisch Hall – Hohenlohe	Hohenlohekreis district; Schwäbisch Hall district
1994	172	Schwäbisch Hall – Hohenlohe	Hohenlohekreis district; Schwäbisch Hall district
1998	172	Schwäbisch Hall – Hohenlohe	Hohenlohekreis district; Schwäbisch Hall district
2002	269	Schwäbisch Hall – Hohenlohe	Hohenlohekreis district; Schwäbisch Hall district
2005	269	Schwäbisch Hall – Hohenlohe	Hohenlohekreis district; Schwäbisch Hall district
2009	268	Schwäbisch Hall – Hohenlohe	Hohenlohekreis district; Schwäbisch Hall district
2013	268	Schwäbisch Hall – Hohenlohe	Hohenlohekreis district; Schwäbisch Hall district
2017	268	Schwäbisch Hall – Hohenlohe	Hohenlohekreis district; Schwäbisch Hall district
2021	268	Schwäbisch Hall – Hohenlohe	Hohenlohekreis district; Schwäbisch Hall district
2025	268	Schwäbisch Hall – Hohenlohe	Hohenlohekreis district; Schwäbisch Hall district

== Members ==
The constituency was first represented by Philipp Jenninger of the Christian Democratic Union (CDU) from 1980 to 1990, followed by Wolfgang von Stetten from 1990 to 2002. Christian von Stetten has been representative since 2002.

Election	Member	Party	%
1980	Philipp Jenninger	CDU	51.4
1983	Philipp Jenninger	CDU	58.5
1987	Philipp Jenninger	CDU	50.1
1990	Wolfgang von Stetten	CDU	43.1
1994	Wolfgang von Stetten	CDU	41.4
1998	Wolfgang von Stetten	CDU	37.2
2002	Christian von Stetten	CDU	47.3
2005	Christian von Stetten	CDU	46.5
2009	Christian von Stetten	CDU	43.3
2013	Christian von Stetten	CDU	52.3
2017	Christian von Stetten	CDU	40.5
2021	Christian von Stetten	CDU	32.1
2025	Christian von Stetten	CDU	36.4

== Election results ==
=== 2025 election ===
Federal election (2025): Schwäbisch Hall – Hohenlohe
Notes:	Blue background denotes the winner of the electorate vote. Pink background denotes a candidate elected from their party list. Yellow background denotes an electorate win by a list member, or other incumbent. A ✓ or ✗ denotes status of any incumbent, win or lose respectively.						
Party	Candidate	Votes	%	±%	Party votes	%	±%
CDU	✓ Christian von Stetten	67,217	36.4	▲4.3	58,817	31.8	▲7.3
AfD	Benjamin Götz	44,361	24.0	▲12.0	46,423	25.1	▲12.4
SPD	Kevin Leiser	27,498	14.9	▼4.7	24,445	13.2	▼8.6
Greens	Harald Ebner	18,528	10.0	▼5.1	18,083	9.8	▼3.5
FDP	Valentin Abel	8,307	4.5	▼7.2	10,582	5.3	▼10.5
dieBasis	Thomas Wilhelm	2,067	1.1	▼1.8	1,115	0.6	▼1.7
Left	Ellena Schumacher-Koelsch	8,902	4.8	▲2.4	9,845	5.3	▲2.4
FW	Falko Bortt	4,614	2.5	▲0.5	2,862	1.5	▼0.2
Tierschutzpartei					1,524	0.8	▼0.3
PARTEI	Marc Kadkalov	1,718	0.9	▼0.5	896	0.5	▼0.5
ÖDP				▼0.7	460	0.2	▼0.2
Bündnis C					529	0.3	▼0.1
Pirates							▼0.4
Volt	Andre Reinhardt	1,477	0.8		1,105	0.6	▲0.3
Team Todenhöfer							▼0.2
BSW					7,991	4.3	
Gesundheitsforschung							▼0.1
Bürgerbewegung							▼0.4
Humanists							▼0.1
BD					266	0.1	
MLPD				▼0.1	69	0.0	0.0
Informal votes		1,415			1,092		
Total valid votes		184,689			185,012		
Turnout		186,104	82.9	▲6.5			
CDU hold	Majority			▲4.3			

=== 2021 election ===
Federal election (2021): Schwäbisch Hall – Hohenlohe
Notes:	Blue background denotes the winner of the electorate vote. Pink background denotes a candidate elected from their party list. Yellow background denotes an electorate win by a list member, or other incumbent. A ✓ or ✗ denotes status of any incumbent, win or lose respectively.						
Party	Candidate	Votes	%	±%	Party votes	%	±%
CDU	✓ Christian von Stetten	54,894	32.1	▼8.4	41,947	24.5	▼9.8
SPD	Kevin Leiser	33,568	19.6	▲1.1	37,272	21.8	▲5.6
Greens	Harald Ebner	25,825	15.1	▲2.5	22,734	13.3	▲1.2
AfD	Jens Moll	20,579	12.0	▼1.5	21,787	12.7	▼1.9
FDP	Valentin Abel	19,941	11.7	▲3.3	27,850	16.3	▲3.5
dieBasis	Marcus Rohrbach	4,923	2.9		4,005	2.3	
Left	Cedric Schiele	4,090	2.4	▼1.9	4,980	2.9	▼2.7
FW	Jürgen Braun	3,460	2.0		2,941	1.7	▲1.2
Tierschutzpartei					1,977	1.2	▲0.5
PARTEI	Knud Wetzel	2,425	1.4		1,672	1.0	▲0.4
ÖDP	Friedrich Zahn	1,239	0.7	▼0.4	716	0.4	▼0.2
Bündnis C					650	0.4	
Pirates					608	0.4	▼0.2
Volt					453	0.3	
Team Todenhöfer					419	0.2	
NPD					332	0.2	▼0.3
Gesundheitsforschung					242	0.1	
Bürgerbewegung					201	0.1	
Humanists					144	0.1	
DiB					107	0.1	0.0
MLPD	Wilhelm Maier	182	0.1	0.0	67	0.0	0.0
Bündnis 21					61	0.0	
LKR					40	0.0	
DKP					25	0.0	0.0
Informal votes		1,561			1,457		
Total valid votes		171,126			171,230		
Turnout		172,687	76.5	▲0.4			
CDU hold	Majority	21,326	12.5	▼9.5			

=== 2017 election ===
Federal election (2017): Schwäbisch Hall – Hohenlohe
Notes:	Blue background denotes the winner of the electorate vote. Pink background denotes a candidate elected from their party list. Yellow background denotes an electorate win by a list member, or other incumbent. A ✓ or ✗ denotes status of any incumbent, win or lose respectively.						
Party	Candidate	Votes	%	±%	Party votes	%	±%
CDU	✓ Christian von Stetten	68,717	40.5	▼11.8	58,215	34.3	▼12.3
SPD	Annette Sawade	31,406	18.5	▼4.4	27,472	16.2	▼3.8
AfD	Stefan Thien	22,894	13.5		24,827	14.6	▲9.6
Greens	Harald Ebner	21,468	12.6	▲2.6	20,512	12.1	▲2.1
FDP	Valentin Christian Abel	14,252	8.4	▲4.5	21,629	12.7	▲6.1
Left	Kai Bock	7,314	4.3	▲0.1	9,594	5.7	▲0.8
ÖDP	Friedrich Zahn	1,934	1.1	▼0.7	1,098	0.6	▼0.1
Tierschutzpartei					1,072	0.6	▼0.1
PARTEI					979	0.6	
FW					896	0.5	▲0.1
Pirates	Alexander Brandt	1,610	0.9	▼1.8	870	0.5	▼1.6
NPD					783	0.5	▼0.9
Tierschutzallianz					380	0.2	
DM					363	0.2	
V-Partei³					291	0.2	
Menschliche Welt					220	0.1	
BGE					195	0.1	
DiB					190	0.1	
MLPD	Karl Wilhelm Maier	265	0.2		121	0.1	0.0
DIE RECHTE					52	0.0	
DKP					36	0.0	
Informal votes		1,900			1,965		
Total valid votes		169,860			169,795		
Turnout		171,760	76.1	▲5.5			
CDU hold	Majority	37,311	22.0	▼7.4			

=== 2013 election ===
Federal election (2013): Schwäbisch Hall – Hohenlohe
Notes:	Blue background denotes the winner of the electorate vote. Pink background denotes a candidate elected from their party list. Yellow background denotes an electorate win by a list member, or other incumbent. A ✓ or ✗ denotes status of any incumbent, win or lose respectively.						
Party	Candidate	Votes	%	±%	Party votes	%	±%
CDU	✓ Christian von Stetten	81,427	52.3	▲9.0	72,835	46.6	▲11.9
SPD	Annette Sawade	35,728	22.9	▲1.4	31,230	20.0	▲1.6
Greens	Harald Ebner	15,569	10.0	▼2.0	15,641	10.0	▼3.1
Left	Florian Vollert	6,626	4.3	▼3.0	7,535	4.8	▼2.8
FDP	Stephen Brauer	6,128	3.9	▼9.2	10,355	6.6	▼12.3
AfD					7,799	5.0	
Pirates	Alexander Brandt	4,226	2.7		3,371	2.2	▲0.2
NPD	Friedrich Kellermann	3,184	2.0	▼0.2	2,119	1.4	▼0.2
ÖDP	Peter Gansky	2,877	1.8		1,188	0.8	▲0.2
Tierschutzpartei					1,143	0.7	0.0
FW					608	0.4	
REP					597	0.4	▼0.6
PBC					574	0.4	▼0.4
RENTNER					442	0.3	
Volksabstimmung					278	0.2	▼0.1
Party of Reason					174	0.1	
PRO					146	0.1	
BIG					94	0.1	
MLPD					81	0.1	0.0
BüSo					23	0.0	0.0
Informal votes		2,624			2,156		
Total valid votes		155,765			156,233		
Turnout		158,389	70.6	▲1.4			
CDU hold	Majority	45,699	29.4	▲7.6			

=== 2009 election ===
Federal election (2009): Schwäbisch Hall – Hohenlohe
Notes:	Blue background denotes the winner of the electorate vote. Pink background denotes a candidate elected from their party list. Yellow background denotes an electorate win by a list member, or other incumbent. A ✓ or ✗ denotes status of any incumbent, win or lose respectively.						
Party	Candidate	Votes	%	±%	Party votes	%	±%
CDU	✓ Christian von Stetten	65,474	43.3	▼3.2	52,745	34.7	▼5.1
SPD	Annette Sawade	32,606	21.5	▼10.4	27,907	18.4	▼11.6
FDP	Stephen Brauer	19,839	13.1	▲6.0	28,688	18.9	▲7.3
Greens	Harald Ebner	18,132	12.0	▲4.8	19,829	13.1	▲3.8
Left	Silvia Ofori	10,938	7.2	▲3.8	11,554	7.6	▲4.0
Pirates					2,950	1.9	
NPD	Lars Gold	3,328	2.2	0.0	2,429	1.6	0.0
REP					1,444	1.0	▼0.5
PBC					1,173	0.8	▼0.5
Tierschutzpartei					1,070	0.7	
Independent	Hans-Jürgen Lange	1,004	0.7				
ÖDP					905	0.6	
Volksabstimmung					401	0.3	
DIE VIOLETTEN					317	0.2	
DVU					157	0.1	
MLPD					86	0.1	0.0
BüSo					78	0.1	0.0
ADM					57	0.0	
Informal votes		3,030			2,561		
Total valid votes		151,321			151,790		
Turnout		154,351	69.1	▼6.0			
CDU hold	Majority	32,868	21.8	▲7.3			

=== 2005 election ===
Federal election (2005): Schwäbisch Hall – Hohenlohe
Notes:	Blue background denotes the winner of the electorate vote. Pink background denotes a candidate elected from their party list. Yellow background denotes an electorate win by a list member, or other incumbent. A ✓ or ✗ denotes status of any incumbent, win or lose respectively.						
Party	Candidate	Votes	%	±%	Party votes	%	±%
CDU	✓ Christian von Stetten	75,371	46.5	▼0.48	64,572	39.9	▼3.6
SPD	Hermann Bachmaier	51,836	32.0	▼2.7	48,634	30.0	▼1.8
Greens	Marcus Wewer	11,577	7.1	▲0.5	14,959	9.2	▼1.0
FDP	Heinrich Ulrich	11,513	7.1	▼1.8	18,806	11.6	▲2.3
Left	Adelheid Scharf	5,578	3.4	▲2.3	5,933	3.7	▲2.8
NPD	Matthias Brodbeck	3,619	2.2		2,666	1.6	▲1.2
PBC	Torsten Krause	2,564	1.6	▲0.3	2,008	1.2	▲0.3
REP					2,271	1.4	▲0.1
Familie					1,286	0.8	
GRAUEN					608	0.4	▲0.3
MLPD					156	0.1	
BüSo					126	0.1	▲0.1
Informal votes		3,457			3,490		
Total valid votes		162,058			162,025		
Turnout		165,515	75.2	▼3.0			
CDU hold	Majority	23,535	14.5				
