= Karoline Breitinger =

German physician

- Born: 4 May 1851; Künzelsau, Germany
- Died: 6 September 1932 (aged 81); Esslingen, Germany
- Occupation: Physician
- Known for: First female doctor in Württemberg

Karoline Breitinger (born 4 May 1851 in Künzelsau – died 6 September 1932 in Esslingen) was a German physician who became the first female doctor in Württemberg.

== Life and work ==
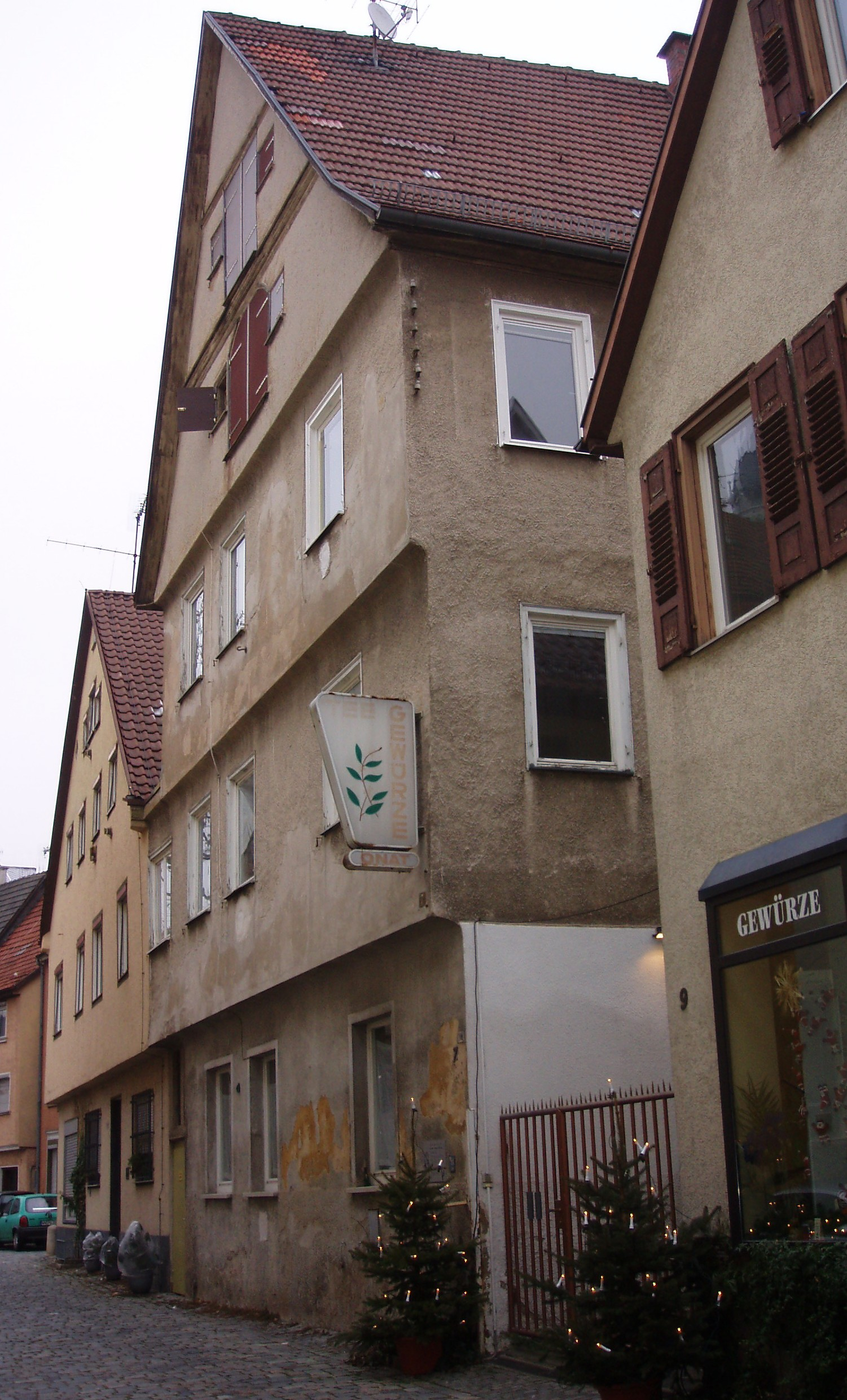
The house at Kupfergasse 7, Esslingen, Germany where Breitinger had her medical offices.

Karoline Breitinger grew up as the youngest of seven siblings born to Heinrich Breitinger, coppersmith. She lost her mother at an early age. At that time, girls were not allowed to attend high school, so from 1871 she lived with one of her brothers in Salzburg, Austria. From 1881 to 1886 she trained as a teacher at the Pedagogium in Linz, Austria, and in 1886 she earned the official diploma of elementary school teacher in Markgröningen, Germany.

=== Career ===
From the summer semester of 1889, she began studying medicine in Zurich, Switzerland. However, because her substitute exam was not recognized as an official high school diploma, she later moved to Bern, Switzerland, where women were allowed to study at universities. She completed her doctorate studies with a thesis on the causes of infanticide and ways of preventing it. This doctorate entitled her to a Swiss license to practice medicine, but not a German one.

Breitinger was not allowed to settle down as a doctor in Heidelberg or Tübingen, Germany so she went to Esslingen and opened a medical practice. There too, because of the foreign origin of her doctorate, she was only allowed to practice in a limited way and without prescribing medication. This made her work very difficult, so she continued to seek a German license to practice medicine.

She tried again to be allowed to take the German state exam but was denied due to resistance from men at the university. Even a petition to the state parliament, which was accompanied by the signatures of 1,400 women from Esslingen, did not help her. Only a change in the examination regulations in 1905, which allowed Realgymnasium graduates to be admitted to study medicine, helped her succeed.

She studied in Strasbourg and finally obtained her license to practice medicine in Germany in 1909 becoming the first female doctor in Württemberg. She worked in several hospitals until 1911 when, at 60 years of age, she settled permanently in Esslingen, where she set up her practice and treated patients for another twenty years. She was a popular physician and often refused to take a fee from patients for her medical treatments.

== Legacy ==
- A memorial plaque is on her former house at Kupfergasse 7, Esslingen, where she had her medical practice.
- Streets in Hegensberg and in Künzelsau are named after her.
- In September 2008, a home economics school with a competence center for health and care was named the Karoline Breitinger School in Künzelsau.
