= Artemis Quartet =

German string quartet

The Artemis Quartet is a German string quartet, founded in 1989 in Lübeck, and now based in Berlin. The quartet is named for the Greek goddess of hunting and the wilderness.

== History ==
The first members of the Artemis Quartet, Wilken Ranck, Isabel Trautwein, Volker Jacobsen, and Eckart Runge, met as students in Lübeck. Heime Müller replaced Isabel Trautwein in 1991. For personal and health reasons, Wilken Ranck left the quartet in 1994, and Volker Jacobsen and Heime Müller left at the end of the 2006/07 season. Natalia Prishepenko, the subsequent first violinist of the quartet, resigned after 18 years of membership in the ensemble in 2012. Newer members were Gregor Sigl (2nd violin), the violist Friedemann Weigle (until his death in July 2015) and the Latvian violinist Vineta Sareika (1st violin). In 2016, Anthea Kreston joined as the group's new second violinist and toured with the quartet until 2019. In April 2019, violinist Suyoen Kim and cellist Harriet Krijgh joined the ensemble. In May 2021, the quartet announced a hiatus in its activities, with the intention to regroup in the future.

The recordings of the ensemble were awarded several prizes, recently including the ECHO Klassik 2006 for their recording of the Beethoven Quartets Op. 95 and 59/1. The quartet was awarded the German Critics' Prize 2001, and the Würth Prize of Jeunesses Musicales Germany 2007. In 2015 the quartet was again awarded the ECHO Klassik in the category of chamber music recording of the year for their recording of the Mendelssohn Quartets. The quartet was also awarded the German Critics' Prize in 2015. In 2016 the quartet won an ECHO Klassik for their recordings of the Brahms Quartets.

== Discography ==
The Artemis Quartet has had an exclusive recording contract with Virgin Classics/EMI since 2005. Their discography includes

- Beethoven: String Quartets Opp. 59 & 95 (2005)
- Ligeti: String Quartet Nos 1 & 2 (2005)
- Verklärte Nacht (2006)
- Dvořák, Janáček: String Quartets (2006)
- Schumann, Brahms: Piano Quintets with Leif Ove Andsnes (2006)
- Schubert: String Quintet in C & String Quartet No. 703 with Truls Mørk (2007)
- Beethoven: String Quartets Op. 18 No. 4 & Op. 59 No. 2 (2008)
- Beethoven: String Quartets Op. 130 No. 133 & Op. 18 No. 6 (2010)
- Beethoven: String Quartets Op. 18 No. 1 & Op. 127 (2010)
- Beethoven: String Quartets Op. 18 No. 5, Op. 18 No. 3, Op. 135 (2011)
- Beethoven: Complete String Quartets (2011)
- Schubert: String Quartets No. 13-15: Rosamunde, Death and the Maiden, String Quartet No. 15 (2012)
- Shostakovich: String Quartets Op. 92 No. 5, Op. 108 No. 7, Op 57. Piano Quintet with Elisabeth Leonskaja (2019)

== Members ==
- 1st Violin: Wilken Ranck (1989–1994), Natalia Prishepenko (1994–2012), Vineta Sareika (2012–present)
- 2nd Violin: Isabel Trautwein (1989–1991), Heime Müller (1991–2007), Gregor Sigl (2007–2016), Anthea Kreston (2016–2019), Suyoen Kim (2019–present)
- Viola: Volker Jacobsen (1989–2007), Friedemann Weigle (2007–2015), Gregor Sigl (2016-present)
- Violoncello: Eckart Runge (1989–2019), Harriet Krijgh (2019-present)
