= Valentin Abel =

German politician (born 1991)

Member of the Bundestag
- In office 2021–2025

Personal details
- Born: 7 February 1991 (age 35) Künzelsau, Germany
- Party: Free Democratic Party

Valentin Abel (born 7 February 1991) is a German politician who served as a Member of Bundestag from the constituency of Schwäbisch Hall – Hohenlohe from 2021 to 2025, as a member of the Free Democratic Party (FDP). Prior to his election to the Bundestag he was the president of the Young Liberals in Baden-Württemberg and a FDP candidate in the 2019 European Parliament election.

== Early life and education ==
was born in Künzelsau, Baden-Württemberg, on 7 February 1991. His primary and secondary education was done in Osterburken. He was a volunteer for the German Red Cross from 2010 to 2011. From 2011 to 2014, he attended the University of Mannheim, with a semester abroad at the University of Edinburgh in 2013, and graduated with a Bachelor of Business Administration. He attended the University of Mannheim from 2014 to 2016, with a semester abroad at Maastricht University in 2015, and graduated with a Master of Business Administration.

== Career ==
From 2017 to 2021, Abel was the chair of the Young Liberals in Baden-Württemberg. In the 2019 European Parliament election he was a candidate for the Free Democratic Party (FDP).

In the 2021 election Abel was elected to the Bundestag from the constituency of Schwäbisch Hall – Hohenlohe as the twelfth member of the FDP's electoral list. In the 2025 election he was not reelected. During Abel's tenure in the Bundestag he served on the Climate Protection and Energy, European Union Affairs, and Transportation committees.

== Political positions ==
Abel supported Germany giving weapons to Ukraine for the Russo-Ukrainian War.

== Works cited ==
=== News ===
- "Abel auf Platz 12 der FDP-Landesliste Baden-Württemberg". meineStimme. 19 October 2020. Archived from the original on 21 June 2025.
- "Abel kandidiert für Europa". meineStimme. 22 July 2018. Archived from the original on 21 June 2025.
- "Einstehen für Freiheit, Demokratie und unsere westlichen Werte muss Mahnung und Inspiration sein". meineStimme. 27 February 2022. Archived from the original on 21 June 2025.
- Chancellor, Thomas (9 April 2024). "BVTM im Gespräch mit MdB Valentin Abel (FDP)". Taxi Heute. Archived from the original on 20 June 2025.
- Donauer, Christoph (4 March 2025). "Die Hohenloher Abgeordneten Kevin Leiser und Valentin Abel sind nicht mehr im Bundestag". Stimme. Archived from the original on 20 June 2025.

=== Web ===
- "Valentin Abel". Bundestag. Archived from the original on 20 June 2025.
