= Wurth =

Wurth is a surname, and may refer to:

- Anthonie Wurth (born 1967), Dutch judoka
- Christin Wurth now Christin Wurth-Thomas (born 1980), American athlete
- François-Xavier Wurth-Paquet (1801–1885), Luxembourgish politician, jurist and archaeologist
- Gary Wurth, Australian rugby league footballer
- Georg Wurth (born 1972), German lobbyist and activist
- Matthew Wurth (1960–2021), Australian former rugby union and rugby league footballer
- Sebastian Wurth (born 1994), German singer
- Wallace Charles Wurth (1896–1960), Australian public servant, soldier and university chancellor

== See also ==
- Würth (surname), or Wuerth
