= Harriet Krijgh =

Dutch cellist

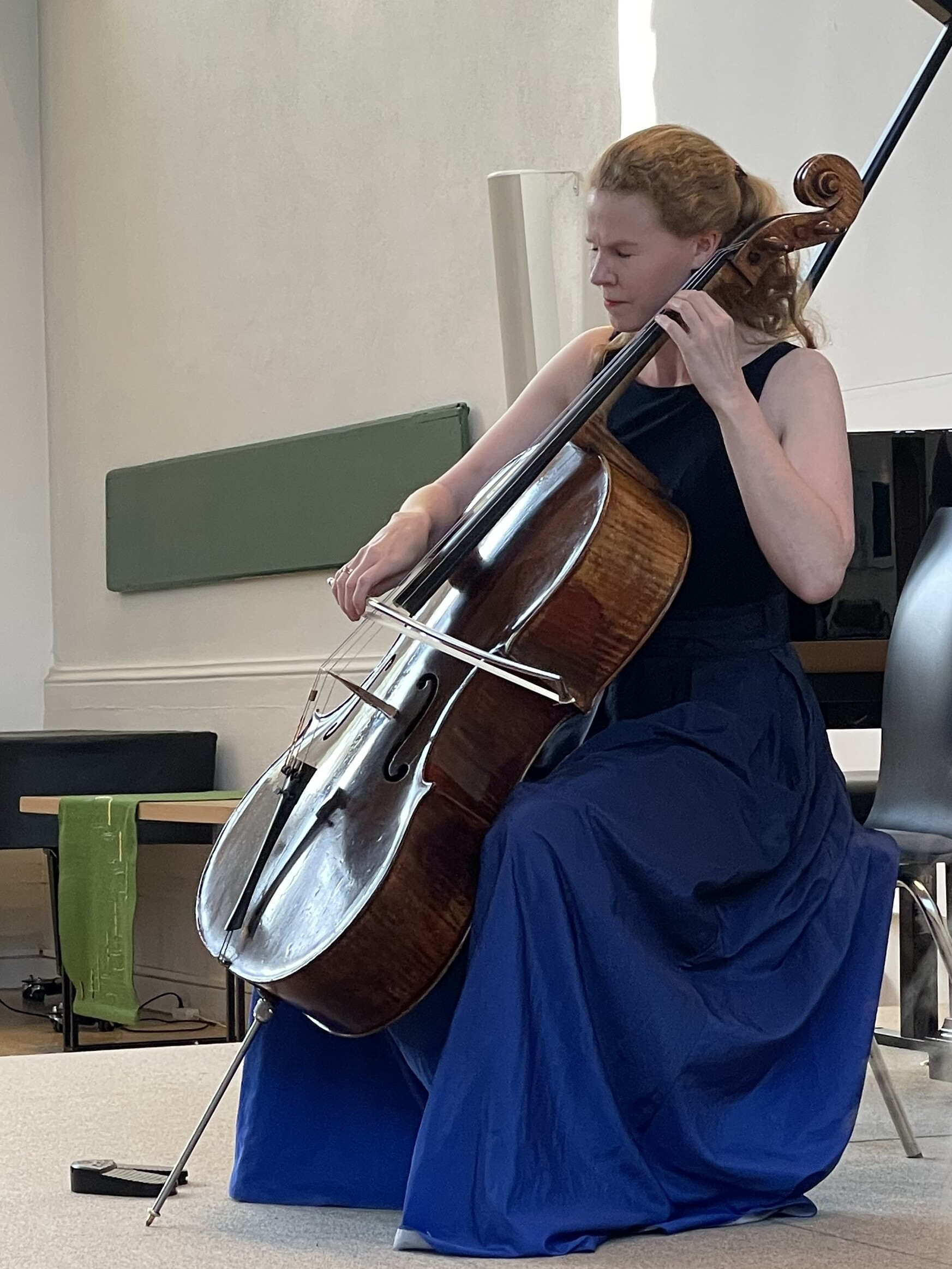
Krijgh (2026)

Harriet Krijgh (born June 1991) is a Dutch cellist.

== Life ==
She received her first cello lessons at the age of five. In 2000, she was accepted into the young talent class at the Utrechts Conservatorium, where she was taught by Lenian Benjamins. In 2004, Harriet moved to Vienna to study cello with Lilia Schulz-Bayrova and Jontscho Bayrov at the Music and Arts University of the City of Vienna. Since September 2013, Harriet has been studying as a "Young Soloist" at the Kronberg Academy with Frans Helmerson, a study made possible by the Casals Scholarship. She continues her artistic training with Schulz-Bayrova in Vienna in parallel. In 2019, she took over the cello part in the Artemis Quartet from founding member Eckart Runge.

In addition to regular concerts and solo recitals in Vienna, Krijgh often plays in chamber music festivals, such as the Haydn Festival Eisenstadt, Diabelli Summer, St.Gallen, Trigonale and Hagen Open. In the Netherlands, she has given recitals in the Concertgebouw Amsterdam, "de Doelen" Rotterdam and Muziekcentrum Vredenburg in Utrecht. In 2011, Krijgh made a concert tour of Asia. She played a number of recitals in Korea and the Triple Concert and the Roccoco Variations in Vietnam. In 2012, Krijgh made her debut in the Konzerthaus Wien with the Haydn C and D concertos.

== Prizes ==
In 2008, she won the first prize of the Princess Christina Concours. She also won first prizes at the national final of the Prima la Musica Competition in Austria and at the Fidelio Competition in Vienna, as well as the "Nicole Janigro Prize" at the international "Antonio Janigro Cello Competition" in Croatia. A success was the 1st prize and the audience award at the Cello Biennale Amsterdam in November 2012.

== Recordings (selection) ==
The following recordings have been released on the CD label Capriccio:

- Kabalevsky: Cello Concerto No. 1 (2018), plus other concertante works by Weinberg and Kabalevsky with other soloists.
- Rachmaninov (2015, Magda Amara/piano).
- Elegy (2014, Deutsche Staatsphilharmonie, Gustavo Gimeno).
- The French Album (2012) with works for cello and piano by Debussy, Franck, Offenbach, Fauré
- Haydn: The Cello Concertos (2012, Vienna Chamber Philharmonic)
- Brahms: The Cello Sonatas (2013, Magda Amara/piano)

In 2018, Krijgh signed an exclusive contract with Deutsche Grammophon:

- Vivaldi (2019, Amsterdam Sinfonietta, Candida Thompson)

== Instrument ==
Krijgh currently plays on a 1723 Domenico Montagnana cello, on loan from the Dkfm. Angelika Prokopp Foundation. The cello was previously played by the British cellist, William Henry Squire (1871-1963) as well as the Norwegian cellist Truls Mørk.
