= Kevin Leiser =

German politician

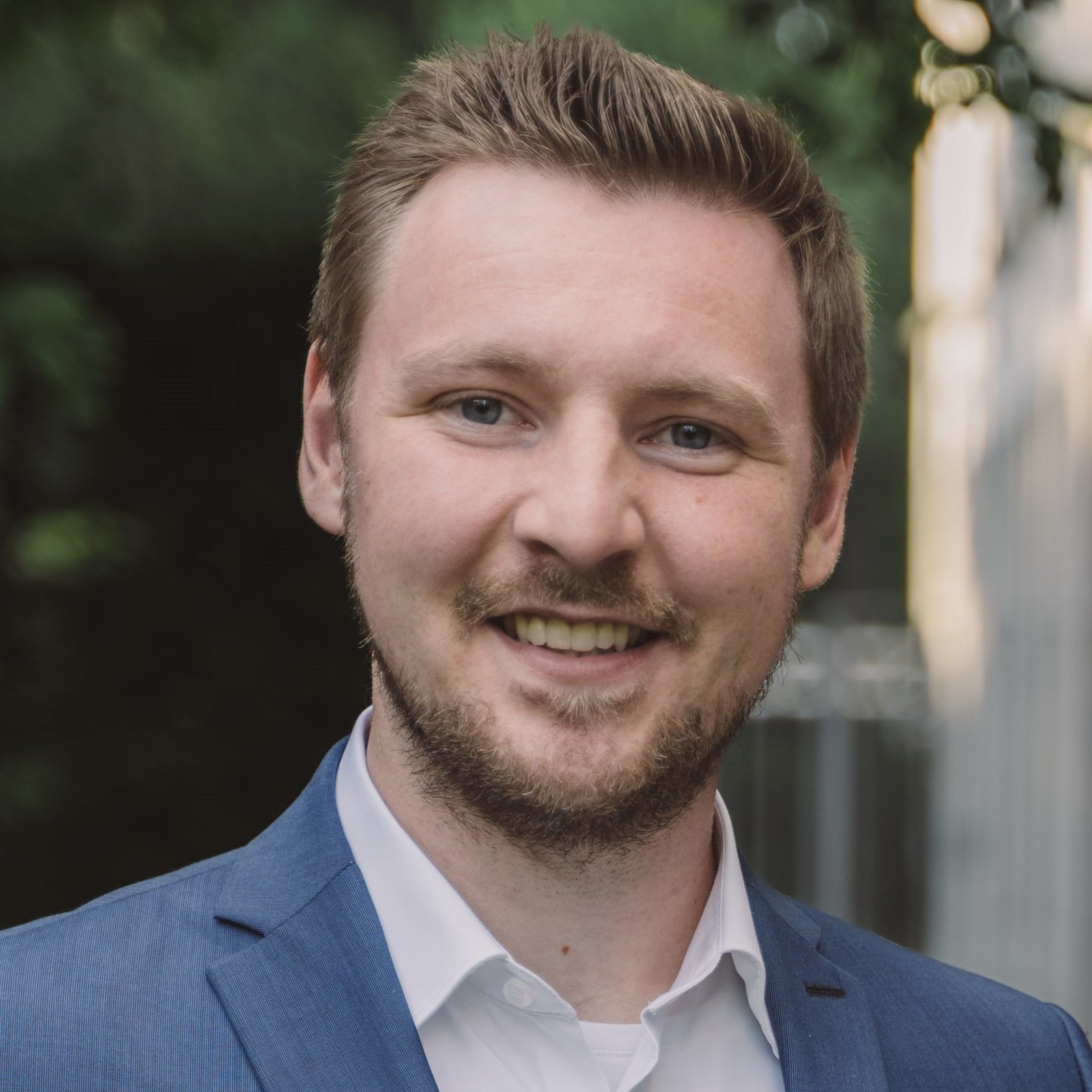

Member of the Bundestag
- Incumbent
- Assumed office 2021

Personal details
- Born: 3 September 1993 (age 33) Crailsheim, Germany
- Party: SPD
- Education: Heidelberg University

Kevin Leiser (born 3 September 1993) is a German teacher and politician of the Social Democratic Party (SPD) who has been serving as member of the Bundestag since 2021.

== Early life and education ==
Leiser was born 1993 in the German town of Crailsheim.

== Political career ==
Leiser was elected to the Bundestag in the 2021 elections, representing the Schwäbisch Hall – Hohenlohe district. In parliament, he has since been serving on the Defence Committee and the Committee on Economic Cooperation and Development.
