= Bettina Würth =

German-born Swiss businesswoman (born 1961)

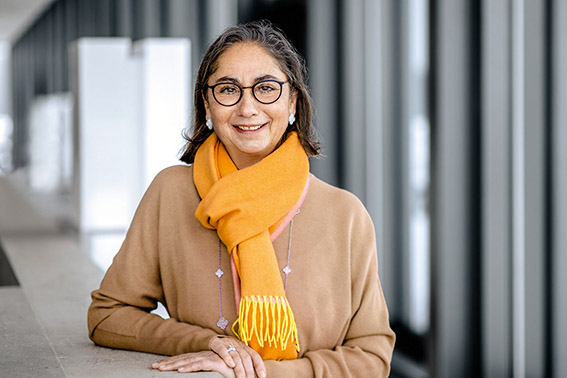
- Born: Bettina Würth; October 9, 1961 (age 64); Schwäbisch Hall, Baden-Württemberg, West Germany
- Occupations: Businesswoman, executive
- Spouse: Markus J.B. Rusch
- Children: 4
- Family: Würth family

Bettina Würth (/wuːrth/woor-th born October 9, 1961) is a German-born Swiss businesswoman, billionaire and chairwoman of the advisory board of Würth Group. She is a granddaughter of company founder Adolf Würth and eldest daughter of Reinhold Würth and therefore member of the Würth family. Würth is among the wealthiest Swiss citizens with an estimated net worth of CHF 3-3.5 billion.

== Early life and education ==
Würth was born October 9, 1961, in Schwäbisch Hall, West Germany the youngest child to Reinhold Würth and his wife Carmen (née Linhardt). Her grandfather founded the German screw wholesale concern Würth Group in 1945. He has one sister, Marion Würth, who initially was active as an organic farmer and now is active in the communications industry. Her brother, Markus Würth, is intellectually disabled due to an injury in vaccination. The Würth family are members of the New Apostolic Church.

She attended a boarding school, however wanted to become a dancer, and dropped out of school in 11th grade. After that she initially moved to Munich where she worked as a trainee in a Kindergarten. Back then she didn't have close contact to her parents and had the strong desire to be independent. However, in 1984, she returned and completed a commercial apprenticeship in the family concern.

== Career ==
After completing her apprenticeship, Würth was engaged in several divisions of the Würth concern, also in positions abroad. In 1992, she was promoted by her father to personal assistant of the manager of the wood division. Several positions led her to work in Spain and also in Switzerland where she met her future husband. In 1996, she formed the company Marion & Bettina Würth GmbH & Co KG, an agency for live communications which subsequently was engaged to develop the new division of Würth Construction in Germany. In 1998, she became a member of the management of Würth Group.

She is the chairwoman of the advisory board of Würth Group. She is also a member of the supervisory board of the Adolf Würth Foundation.

== Personal life ==
Würth is married to Swiss Markus Johannes Baptist Rusch, who took the last name of his wife. They have four children. Due to her marriage she also holds Swiss citizenship.
