= Heilbronn University of Applied Sciences =

German university

Coordinates: 49°07′19″N 9°12′40″E

- Hochschule Heilbronn
- Former names: Staatliche Ingenieurschule Heilbronn; Fachhochschule Heilbronn
- Type: Public
- Established: April 17, 1961
- Rector: Oliver Lenzen
- Administrative staff: 660 (therefrom 230 academic staff)
- Students: 8.369 (2015)
- Location: Heilbronn, Künzelsau and Schwäbisch Hall, Baden-Württemberg, Germany
- Website: www.hs-heilbronn.de
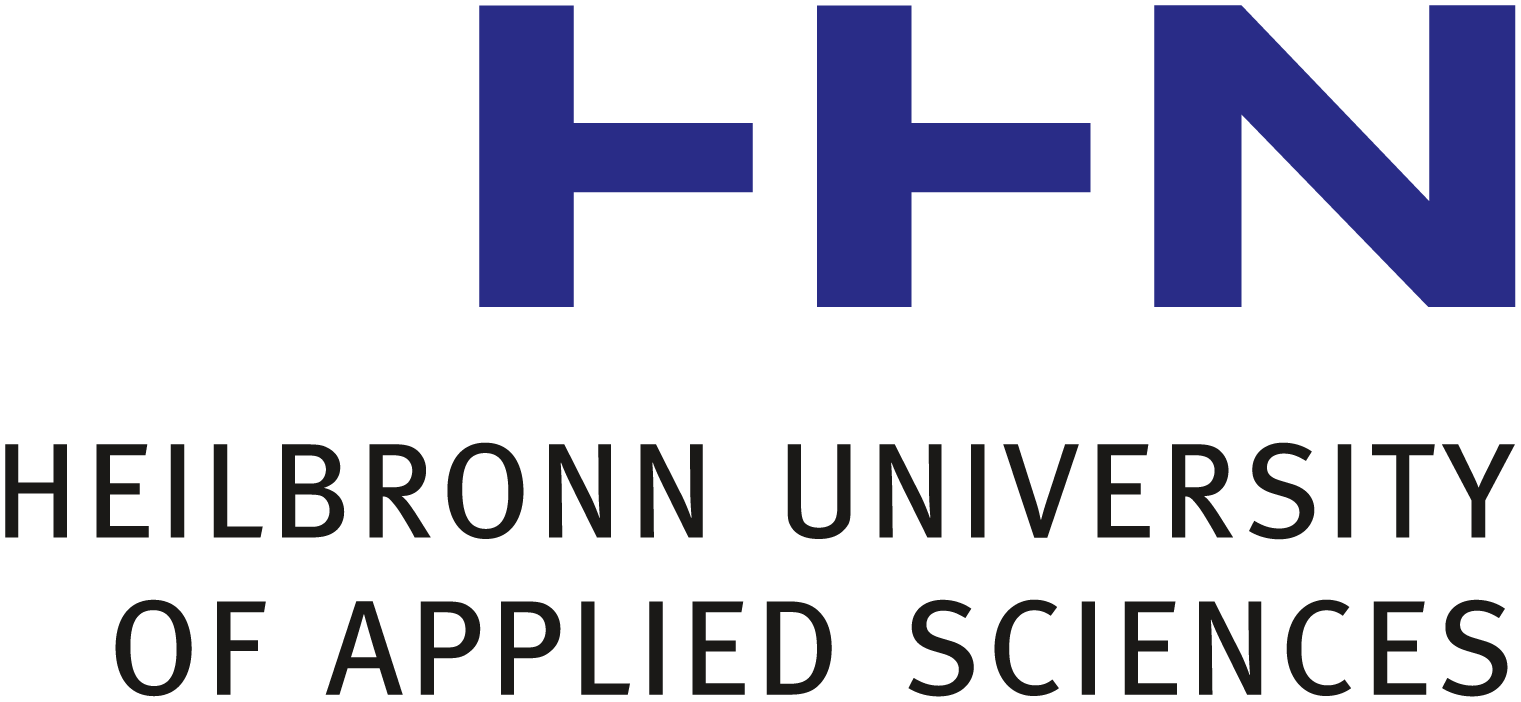

Heilbronn University of Applied Sciences
- Simplified Chinese: 海尔布隆大学
- Traditional Chinese: 海爾布隆大學
Transcriptions
Standard Mandarin
- Hanyu Pinyin: Hǎi'ěr Bùlóng Dàxué

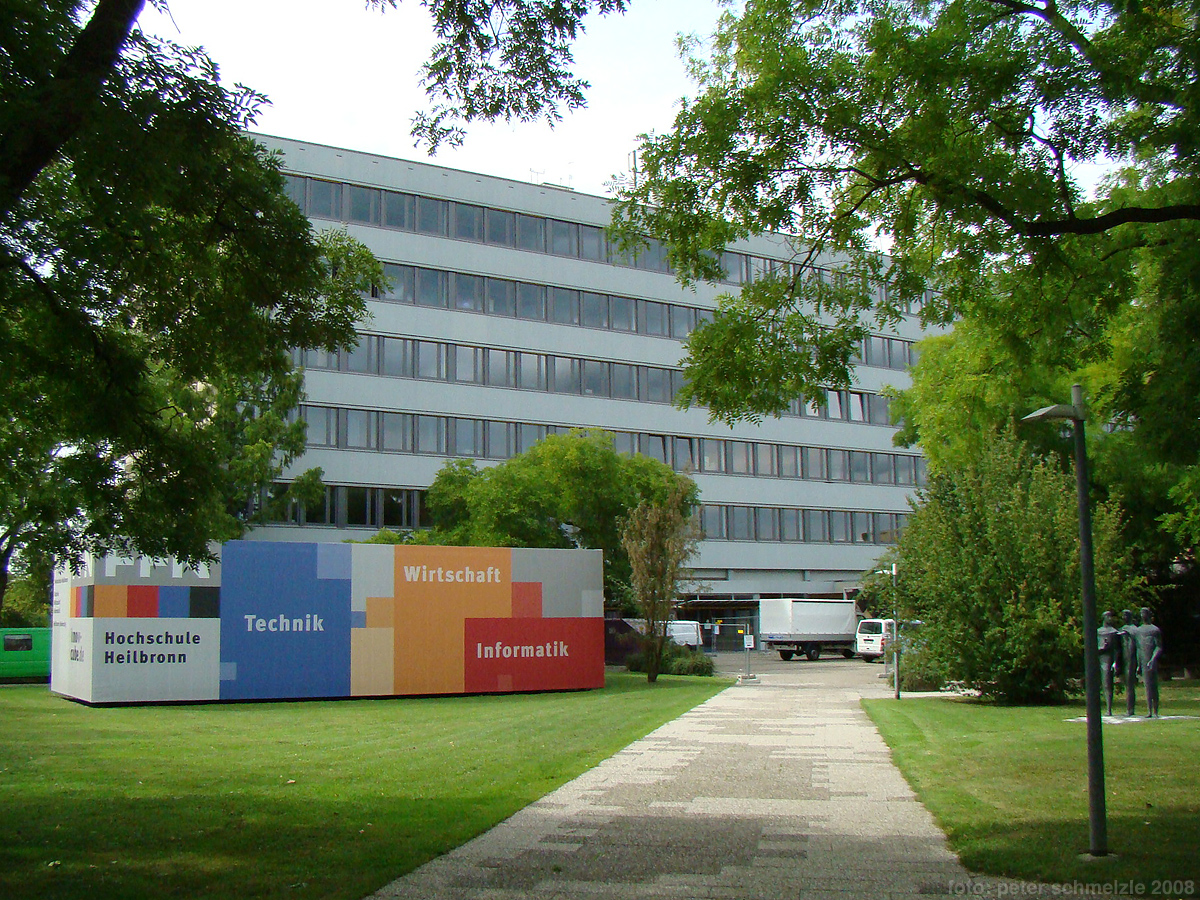
The main building on the Heilbronn campus.

Heilbronn University of Applied Sciences, (German: Hochschule Heilbronn), is a German University of Applied Sciences with campuses in Heilbronn-Sontheim, in the centre of Heilbronn (Bildungscampus), in Künzelsau and Schwäbisch Hall. Heilbronn University of Applied Sciences ranks amongst the major institutions of Higher Education in the state of Baden-Württemberg where it caters for over 8,000 degree-seeking students on three campuses, namely Heilbronn, Künzelsau and Schwäbisch Hall.

The university's second campus is located in Künzelsau, the economic centre of the Hohenlohe district, its third in Schwäbisch Hall.

== History ==
- At April 17, 1961 the Staatliche Ingenieurschule Heilbronn (State Engineering School) was established in Heilbronn.
- Since 1965 it is located in Heilbronn-Sontheim.
- In 1969 the four existing technical study courses were complemented by the first economical course.
- In 1971 the school was renamed to Fachhochschule Heilbronn (University of Applied Sciences)
- In 1972 the study course medical computer science was founded in cooperation with the University of Heidelberg.
- In 1988 the outside campus Künzelsau opened.
- Since 2004 the diplom degrees were replaced by a bachelor/master-system.
- In 2005 the Fachhochschule was renamed to Hochschule Heilbronn (University).
- In 2009 the outside campus Schwäbisch Hall opened.
- In 2011 near the city centre of Heilbronn a new campus as part of the Bildungscampus Heilbronn was opened.
- In 2018 the Heilbronn University was renamed to Heilbronn University of Applied Sciences.

== Overview ==
=== Faculties and courses ===
- Mechanics and Electronics with 5 bachelor and 6 master courses.
- Industrial and Process Engineering with 3 bachelor and 2 master courses.
- Informatics with 2 bachelor and 2 master courses
- Business and Transport Management with 4 Bachelor courses.
- International Business with 5 bachelor and 3 master courses.
- Economics and Engineering with 8 bachelor and 4 master courses.
- Management and Sales with 4 bachelor and 1 master courses.

== Course Range ==
Business-related subjects:

- Financial & Management Accounting
- Finance
- Human Resource Management
- International Management
- Marketing

Economic & Cultural Area Studies:

- Eastern Europe
- Francophone World
- Hispanic Countries
- Middle East and North Africa

Language Area Studies:

- Arabic
- French
- Russian
- Spanish

== Partner universities ==
Egypt (4)

- Misr - Misr International University (MIU)
- Alexandria - Pharos University
- GUC-German University in Cairo
- AUC - The American University in Cairo

Argentina (1)

- La Plata - National University of La Plata

Armenia (1)

- Yerevan - State Engineering University of Armenia

Australia (1)

- Sunshine Coast - University of Sunshine Coast

Brazil (4)

- Säo Paulo - Escola Superior de Propaganda e Marketing
- Recife - Federal University of Pernambuco
- Belo Horizonte - Federal University of Minas Gerais
- Federal University of Santa Maria - UFSM

Chile (1)

- Santiago de Chile - Universidad de Chile

France

- Université de Haute Alsace (Colmar)
- Université Lumière Lyon 2
- Université Catholique de Lyon
- Université Haut Savoie Mont Blanc (Chambéry, Bourget and Annnecy)
- ESC Clermont Business School
- IPAC Nice

Indonesia (2)

- UNDHIRA Dhyana Pura University
- University of Tarumanagara

Ireland (1)

- Dublin - Dorset College

Jordan (1)

- Amman - German Jordanian University

Cuba (2)

- Havana - University of Havana
- Santa Clara, Universidad Central "Marta Abreu" de Las Villas

Morocco (1)

- Rabat Business School

Tunisia (2)

- Tunis - University of Tunis
- Université de Carthage / IHEC Carthage

== Approximate number of students ==
In terms of number of students, Heilbronn University of Applied Sciences is the largest University of Applied Sciences in the state of Baden-Württemberg.

- Heilbronn: 5.868
- Künzelsau: 1.548
- Schwäbisch Hall: 952
