= Philipp Jenninger =

German politician and diplomat (1932–2018)

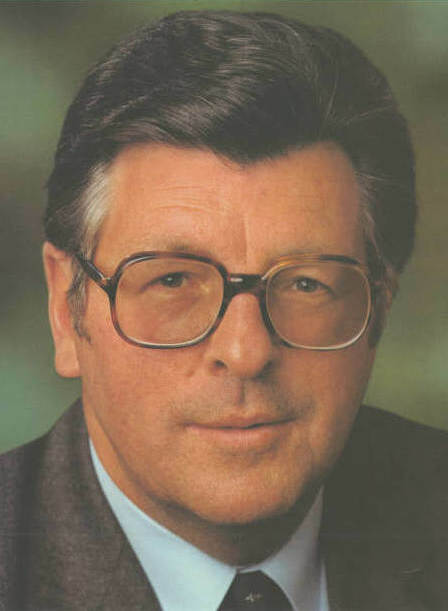
- Jenninger in 1987

President of the Bundestag
- In office 5 November 1984 – 11 November 1988
- Preceded by: Rainer Barzel
- Succeeded by: Rita Süssmuth

Member of the Bundestag
- In office 20 October 1969 – 20 December 1990
- Preceded by: Heinrich Stooß
- Succeeded by: Wolfgang von Stetten
- Constituency: Crailsheim (1969–1980); Schwäbisch Hall (1980–1990)

German Ambassador to the Holy See
- In office 1995–1997
- President: Roman Herzog
- Preceded by: Hans-Joachim Hallier
- Succeeded by: Jürgen Oesterhelt

German Ambassador to Austria
- In office 1991–1995
- President: Richard von Weizsäcker; Roman Herzog
- Preceded by: Dietrich von Brühl
- Succeeded by: Ursula Seiler-Albring

Personal details
- Born: 10 June 1932 Rindelbach, Baden-Württemberg, Germany
- Died: 4 January 2018 (aged 85) Stuttgart, Baden-Württemberg, Germany
- Party: Christian Democratic Union

Philipp Jenninger (10 June 1932 – 4 January 2018) was a German politician of the Christian Democratic Union and diplomat. He was the ninth president of the Bundestag from 1984 to 1988. He also served as Member of the German Parliament, the Bundestag (1969–1990), Minister of State at the German Chancellery (1982–1984), German Ambassador to Austria (1991–1995) and German Ambassador to the Holy See (1995–1997).

== Life and ministerial career ==
Phillipp Jenninger, whose full name is Philipp-Hariolf Jenninger, was born in 1932 in Rindelbach, now a part of Ellwangen. He studied law at the University of Tübingen, obtaining a doctoral degree in 1957 with a dissertation titled Die Reformbedürftigkeit des Bundesverfassungsgerichts (The necessity of reform of the Federal Constitutional Court) and passing the state examination in 1959. In 1960, he started working in the Bundeswehr administration in Stuttgart. He became an assistant in the Federal Ministry of Defense and later personal assistant and press contact of Federal Minister for the Affairs of the Defence Council Heinrich Krone. After the dissolution of this ministry, he worked from 1966 to 1969 as political assistant of Federal Minister of Finance Franz Josef Strauß.

Between 1982 and 1984, Jenninger served as Minister of State at the German Chancellery, under Chancellor Helmut Kohl.

== Bundestag membership and presidency ==
Jenninger was a member of the Bundestag from 1969 to 1990, always as directly elected representative of a constituency. At first, he represented Crailsheim; after 1980, he represented Schwäbisch Hall.

After Rainer Barzel's resignation, Jenninger was elected President of the Bundestag on 5 November 1984. As President, he made a controversial speech in a special session on 10 November 1988 commemorating the 50th anniversary of Kristallnacht. Jenninger tried to explain the reasons behind German enthusiasm for National Socialism in the 1930s. His speech was presented badly (by his own later admission), as his way of speaking allowed the interpretation that Jenninger didn't sufficiently dissociate himself from the Nazi ideas he referred to, making it hard to distinguish what were his own ideas and what were the "fascinating" (as Jenninger said) Nazi ideas he was just reporting. More than 50 members of parliament walked out during their President's speech in protest. This caused a political storm, and Jenninger resigned his Bundestag presidency on 11 November. He did not stand for reelection as a Bundestag member in the 1990 elections. One year after the incident, Jewish community leader Ignatz Bubis, who later became chairman of the Central Council of Jews in Germany, used several passages of Jenninger's speech verbatim (although he didn't use the word "fascinating"), demonstrating that the content of Jenninger's speech had not been ambiguous, just his performance of it.

== Ambassador to Austria and the Holy See ==
Jenninger served as German ambassador to Vienna, Austria from 1991 to 1995, and as ambassador to the Holy See from 1995 to 1997.

== Other offices ==
Philipp Jenninger was President of the European Movement in Germany from 1985 to 1990, and has since been their honorary President. He was a member of the presidium of Studienzentrum Weikersheim.

== Death ==
Jenninger died on 4 January 2018 in Stuttgart, aged 85.

== Honours ==
- Knight Grand Cross of the Order of Merit of the Italian Republic (1986)

== Literature ==
- Michael F. Feldkamp (ed.), Der Bundestagspräsident. Amt - Funktion - Person. 16. Wahlperiode, München 2007, ISBN 978-3-7892-8201-0
- Jürgen Mittag: "Vom Honoratiorenkreis zum Europanetzwerk: Sechs Jahrzehnte Europäische Bewegung Deutschland"; in: 60 Jahre Europäische Bewegung Deutschland; Berlin 2009; pp. 12–28
- Jeffrey Herf: "Philipp Jenninger and the Dangers of Speaking Clearly." Partisan Review 56 (1989): 225–236.

Political offices
Preceded by Rainer Barzel	President of the West German Bundestag; 1984–1988	Succeeded by Rita Süssmuth
