= Reinhold Würth =

German businessman (born 1935)

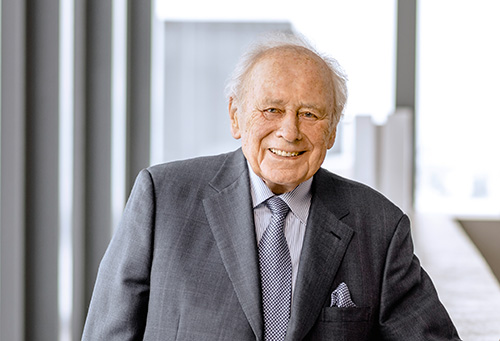
- Würth in 2020
- Born: 20 April 1935 (age 91); Öhringen, Württemberg, Germany
- Occupation: Businessman
- Title: Chairman: Adolf Würth Group
- Children: 3, including Bettina Würth
- Father: Adolf Würth

Reinhold Würth (born 20 April 1935) is a German businessman and art collector. In 1954, at the age of 19, he took over his father's wholesale screw business and built it into the Würth Group, which posted €19.9 billion (US$21.68 billion) in sales in 2022.

Since the 1960s, Würth has collected art. As of 2021, the collection contains over 18,300 works, focused on the late 19th century onwards.

He is married with three children and lives in Künzelsau, Germany.

As of November 2024, Forbes estimated Würth's net worth at $33.6 billion, the world's 45th-richest person.

== Life ==
=== Early life ===
Reinhold Würth is the son of Alma Würth and Adolf Würth, who founded a screw wholesaling business for carpentry and metalworking trades in Künzelsau, Hohenlohe, in July 1945. He received violin lessons as a child. At the age of 14, his father withdrew him from upper secondary school (Oberrealschule) and, in 1949, hired him as an apprentice and second employee in his screw wholesaling business in Künzelsau.

=== Professional career ===
When his father died in 1954, Reinhold Würth was 19 years old. After reaching the age of majority (then 21), he assumed management of the company two years later, in 1956. Over the following decades, Würth transformed the regional trading business into a global enterprise. His clients remain primarily from the commercial and industrial sectors. Gradually, Würth began acquiring screw manufacturers. As the domestic market for fastening technology was highly fragmented and susceptible to economic fluctuations, he expanded operations internationally. In 1962, the first foreign sales subsidiary was established in the Netherlands.

By 2020, the Würth Group operated through over 400 companies in more than 80 countries, generating revenue of €14.4 billion in the 2020 fiscal year. Würth stepped down from operational management in 1994 and was chairman of the company’s advisory board until 2006. From 1999 to 2003, he headed the newly founded Institute for Entrepreneurship at the Karlsruhe Institute of Technology. To ensure the company’s long-term stability, Reinhold Würth established four family foundations in 1987 (named after his wife Carmen Würth and their three children), transferring his shares in the operational business to them. He remained chairman of the Foundation Supervisory Board, the Würth Group’s highest governing body, until 31 December 2024, after which his grandson Benjamin Würth assumed the role. His daughter Bettina Würth has chaired the Würth Group’s advisory board since 2006.

Together with his wife Carmen, he also founded the nonprofit Würth Foundation in 1987.

Reinhold Würth holds the honorary title Prof. Dr. h. c. mult., a non-academic distinction.

=== Tax evasion ===
In late March 2008, allegations surfaced that Reinhold Würth had committed tax evasion. The news magazine Der Spiegel published leaked documents revealing that the Stuttgart public prosecutor’s office had been investigating Würth and five associates since autumn 2006. The Heilbronn District Court issued a penalty order against Würth totaling 700 daily fines. The exact amount was not disclosed but reportedly reached up to €3.5 million. The Stuttgart prosecutors noted that Würth had repaid the tax debt, which influenced the penalty calculation. The conviction was expunged from his record in 2012. Two other Würth Group executives were also fined.

According to prosecutors, none of the accused had gained “personal benefits.” The dispute centered on cost allocations between domestic and foreign subsidiaries. The tax legality of these allocations through the German parent company was the core issue. Würth opted to settle by repaying taxes, paying a fine, and accepting a criminal record to avoid prolonged litigation and reputational damage to his life’s work. In an interview with FAZ, he stated, “Had I been younger, I would have fought this in court.”

Following the case, Würth acquired Austrian citizenship and considered relocating the Würth Group’s headquarters to Switzerland. However, Handelsblatt reported that he abandoned the plan due to logistical complexity and his wife’s objections.

=== Miscellaneous ===
Together with his wife Carmen, he also founded the nonprofit Würth Foundation in 1987.

Reinhold Würth holds the honorary title Prof. Dr. h. c. mult., a non-academic distinction.

=== Wealth ===
Reinhold Würth ranks among the world’s wealthiest individuals. According to Forbes, he and his family held 47th place on the global billionaires list in 2024, with an estimated net worth of $27.5 billion, making them Germany’s third-richest family. Business Insider placed his 2024 wealth at approximately €33.54 billion.

=== Family ===
Würth has been married to Carmen Würth (née Linhardt, b. 1937) since 1956, and they have three adult children. Both are members of the New Apostolic Church. They have resided at Hermersberg Castle near Niedernhall since 1974; the 1540-built structure was meticulously restored, along with other historic Hohenlohe buildings. Würth maintains a secondary residence in Salzburg. In 2009, he purchased the motor yacht Vibrant Curiosity, valued at $100 million. For over 40 years, he flew private jets as a licensed commercial pilot (ATPL) before relinquishing his license in 2015 for health reasons.

In June 2015, Würth’s 50-year-old son, who has intellectual disabilities due to a childhood vaccine injury and lived in a care home in Schlitz, was kidnapped. He was released unharmed. On 14 March 2018, news agencies reported the arrest of a suspect, with a trial opening in October 2018. On 27 November 2018, the Gießen Regional Court acquitted the defendant, citing insufficient evidence linking him to the crime.

=== Family involvement in the company ===
Reinhold and Carmen Würth’s daughter Bettina Würth joined the Würth Group’s five-member advisory board after training within the company and has chaired it since 2006.

Since 19 January, grandson Benjamin Würth has been CEO of Würth International AG in Chur (specializing in centralized procurement) and one of five members of the Foundation supervisory board. He succeeded his grandfather as chairman in January 2025. His brother Sebastian Würth heads the offshore division and sits on the Würth Group’s advisory board.

Granddaughter Maria Würth, Bettina’s daughter, is an art historian on the Würth Foundation’s art advisory board, focusing on its museums and galleries.

== See also ==
- List of billionaires
