= Harald Ebner =

German politician (born 1964)

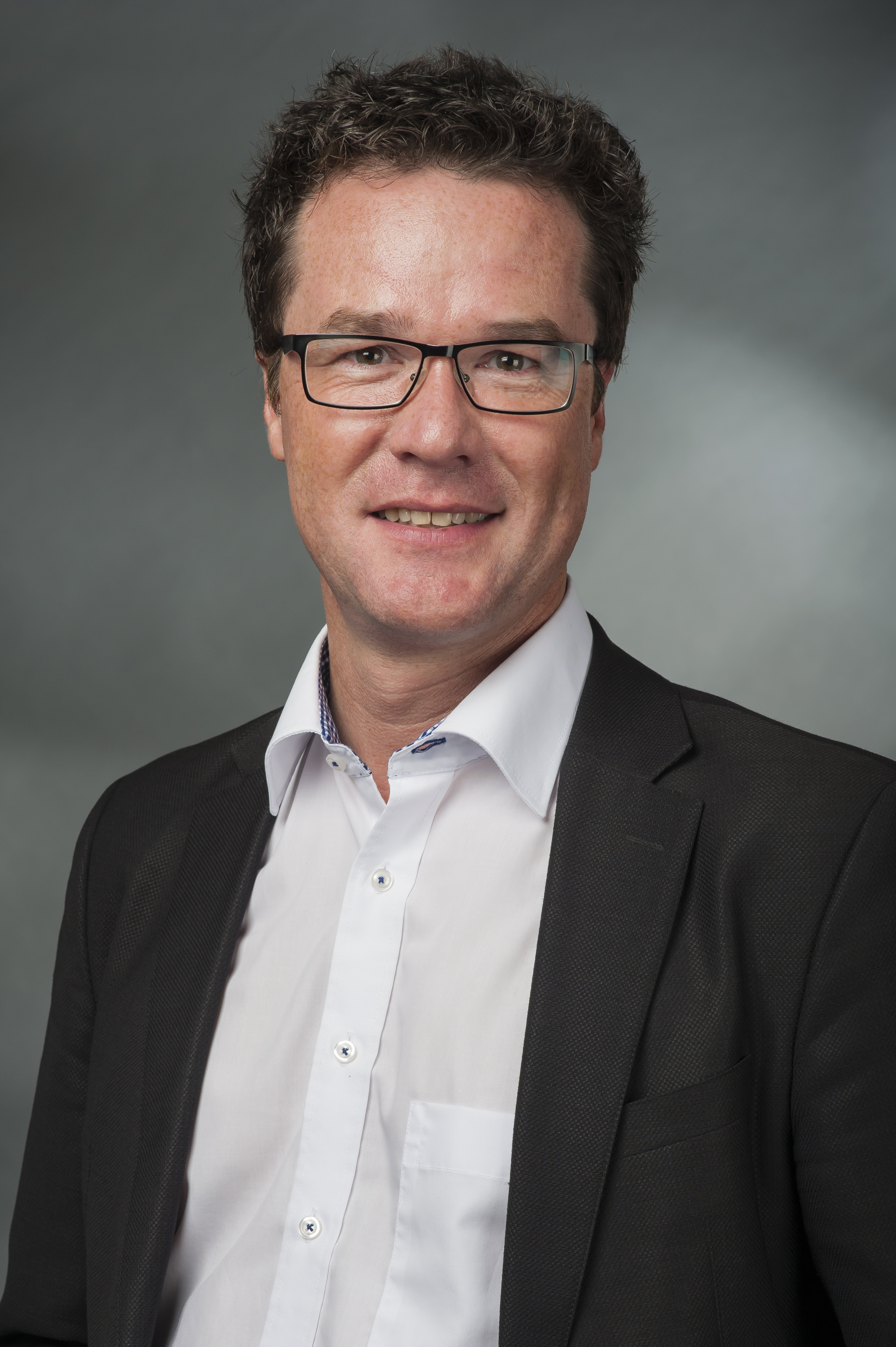
- Harald Ebner in 2014

Member of the Bundestag
- Incumbent
- Assumed office 2011

Personal details
- Born: 8 July 1964 (age 61) Göppingen, West Germany (now Germany)
- Party: Greens

Harald Ebner (born 8 July 1964) is a German politician of Alliance 90/The Greens who has been serving as a member of the Bundestag from the state of Baden-Württemberg since 2011.

== Early life and career ==
Growing up on a farm, Ebner was drawn back to agriculture after his school-leaving examination and thus to Hohenlohe, where he did his community service in the Demeter farm of a social therapy institution.

Ebner studied at the University of Hohenheim, graduating with a degree in agricultural engineering, and works as a landscape ecologist in the state nature conservation administration of Baden-Württemberg.

== Political career ==
Ebner has been a member of the German Bundestag since 25 May 2011. He was his parliamentary group’s coordinator in the Committee on Food and Agriculture and an alternate member of the Committee on the Environment, Nature Conservation and Nuclear Safety. He was also the group’s spokesperson on genetic engineering, bio-economic policy and forest policy.

In addition to his committee assignments, Ebner is part of the German Parliamentary Friendship Group for Relations with the Cono Sur States. Since 2019, he has been a member of the German delegation to the Franco-German Parliamentary Assembly.

In the negotiations to form a coalition government under the leadership of Minister-President of Baden-Württemberg Winfried Kretschmann following the 2021 state elections, Ebner was a member of the working group on agriculture, consumer protection, animal welfare and tourism.

In the negotiations to form a so-called traffic light coalition of the Social Democratic Party (SPD), the Green Party and the Free Democratic Party (FDP) on the national level following the 2021 federal elections, Ebner was part of his party's delegation in the working group on agriculture and nutrition, co-chaired by Till Backhaus, Renate Künast and Carina Konrad.

Since the 2021 elections, Ebner has been chairing the Committee on the Environment, Nature Conservation and Nuclear Safety.

== Other activities ==
- Nuclear Waste Disposal Fund (KENFO), Alternate Member of the Board of Trustees (since 2022)
- Nature and Biodiversity Conservation Union (NABU), Member
