= Adolf Würth =

German entrepreneur (1909–1954)

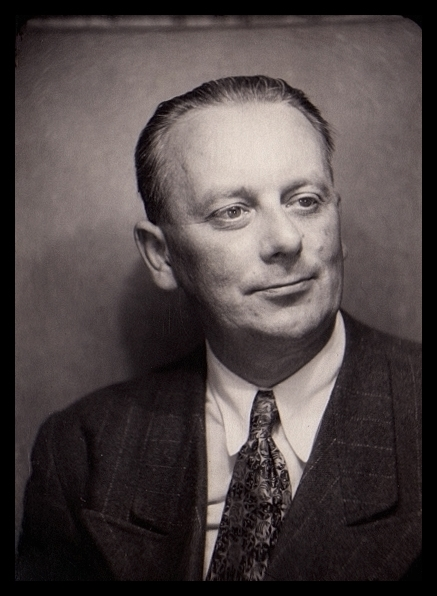
- Born: Adolf Würth; February 7, 1909; Ilsfeld, Grand Duchy of Baden, German Empire
- Died: December 14, 1954 (aged 45); Künzelsau, Baden-Württemberg, West Germany
- Occupations: Businessman, screw wholesaler
- Known for: Founding Würth Group
- Spouse: Alma Schrott Kindermann (m. 1932)
- Children: 2, including Reinhold

Adolf Würth (/wuːrth/woor-th February 7, 1909 – December 14, 1954), also spelled Wuerth, was a German businessman. In 1945, he founded what today is known as Würth Group, the world's largest industrial screw distributor. He is the father of Reinhold Würth.

== Early life and education ==
Würth was born in Ilsfeld, Grand Duchy of Baden to Friedrich Würth. His father was a farmer, winemaker and innkeeper. In 1922, he became an apprentice in the hardware business of the Reisser Brothers in Kupferzell, which operated stores in Künzelsau, Öhringen and Schwäbisch Hall.

== Career ==
Immediately after World War II, Würth founded his independent company Adolf Würth, Holzschrauben, Künzelsau (en: Adolf Würth, wood screws, Künzelsau) as a sole proprietorship on July 16, 1945. However, his wife Alma could also be seen as the initiator of the venture.

After the end of the Second World War, my mother was more of the driving force behind urging my father to become self-employed

— Reinhold Würth

In December 1952, the company moved into its own headquarters on Bahnhofstrasse in Künzelsau.

== Personal life ==
On August 6, 1932, he married Alma Kindermann (née Schrott; 1913–2006). She was previously widowed and had no children from her marriage. They had two sons;

- Reinhold Würth (April 20, 1935), who scaled Würth Group to its multinational level and today is estimated to be worth $26.9 billion.
- Klaus-Frieder Würth (April 11, 1944)

Würth died on December 14, 1954, after a heart attack. After his death the family business was taken-over by his wife and his 19-year-old son Reinhold. They turned the company into a multinational screw concern (today also known as Adolf Würth GmbH & Co KG - named after the founding father).
