= Würth =

Multinational hardware wholesaler

The Würth Group (Würth)
- Type: GmbH (Private company)
- Industry: Fasteners, chemicals, safety products, tools, inventory management
- Founded: 1945
- Headquarters: Künzelsau, Baden-Württemberg, Germany
- Key people: Robert Friedmann (Chairman of the Central Managing Board), Dr. Jan Allmann, Thomas J. O'Neill, Rainer Bürkert, Bernd Herrmann, Joachim Kaltmaier (Members of the Central Managing Board)
- Revenue: ▲€ 20.396 billion (2023)
- Operating income: ▲€ 1.5 billion (2023)
- Number of employees: 87,047 (2023)
- Website: wuerth.com

The Würth Group (German: Würth-Gruppe, pronounced [ˈvʏʁtɡʁʊpə]) is a worldwide wholesaler of fasteners, screws and screw accessories. Würth expanded its range and today offers a full range of business equipment for craft businesses in a kind of supermarket of its own. Würth offers dowels, chemicals, electronic and electromechanical components, furniture and construction fittings, tools, machines, installation material, automotive hardware, inventory management, storage and retrieval systems. The group of over 400 companies across 80+ countries has been servicing the automotive, woodworking, metalworking, industrial and construction industries.

Würth was founded in 1945 by Adolf Würth in Künzelsau, Germany. The company is family owned and has been run by his son Reinhold Würth since 1954.

== History ==
Würth was founded by Adolf Würth (1909–1954), for the purpose of selling screws in 1945 in Künzelsau (hence the company logo, which consists of the family name and a W of two screw heads with cylindrical and round heads). After the death of Adolf Würth, his son Reinhold Würth took over in 1954 at the age of 19 with his mother Alma Würth, making it a two-person company.

Since then, the company has been active in the distribution of fasteners and tools with over 100,000 different products in these lines. Its more than 3.9 million customers include companies from the construction industry, wood and metal crafting, automotive companies, and, increasingly, industrial customers.

Today the Würth Group operates worldwide and employs over 81,000 people, making it one of the largest non-listed companies in Germany. The German newspaper Die Welt listed it as 91 on its list of top 500 companies.

On 1 January 1994, Reinhold Würth withdrew from management and took over as Chairman of the Würth Advisory Board. On 1 March 2006, he passed on this office to his daughter Bettina Würth and became Chairman of the Supervisory Board of the Würth Group.

On 27 October 2006, after five years of research, the group opened a production plant in Schwäbisch Hall for new types of solar cells using copper, indium, and selenium instead of silicon.

Reinhold Würth advised his approximately 25,000 employees in Germany not to vote for the right-wing extremist AfD in 2024. In a five-page letter, the then 88-year-old noted that not everything was going well in the current Scholz government, but that the AfD wanted to abolish the party state.

Unlike other trading companies, Würth spends much on research and development. It set a record in 2007 with more than 60 patents.

== Corporate structure ==
Besides the German parent company Adolf Würth GmbH & Co, Würth includes more than 400 companies in 86 countries, which are divided into two lines:

- The Würth Line (die Würth-Linie), whose companies carry the Würth name;
- 206 allied companies, which are usually purchased companies that operate under their original name or have been integrated into another allied company.

The Würth Group specializes in sales through its representatives. It operates globally, with continuous expansions due to sales. In Germany, the number of employees amounts to 24,971. Around the world, the Würth Group employs more than 33,000 sales representatives in the field.

== Cultural ties ==
=== Würth Foundation ===
The Würth Group supports the Würth Foundation (German: Stiftung Würth), established by Carmen and Reinhold Würth in 1987 to promote art and culture, science and research, education and integration. The organization gives many types of awards, including the Würth Prize for European Literature and the Würth Prize of Jeunesses Musicales Germany. Since 1993, Würth has awarded the Robert Jacobsen Prize to contemporary visual artists. In addition, the Würth Foundation engages in school and university funding. In 2005, the Künzelsau College of Applied Sciences of the University of Heilbronn was renamed Reinhold Würth University.

=== Museums and Würth Collection ===
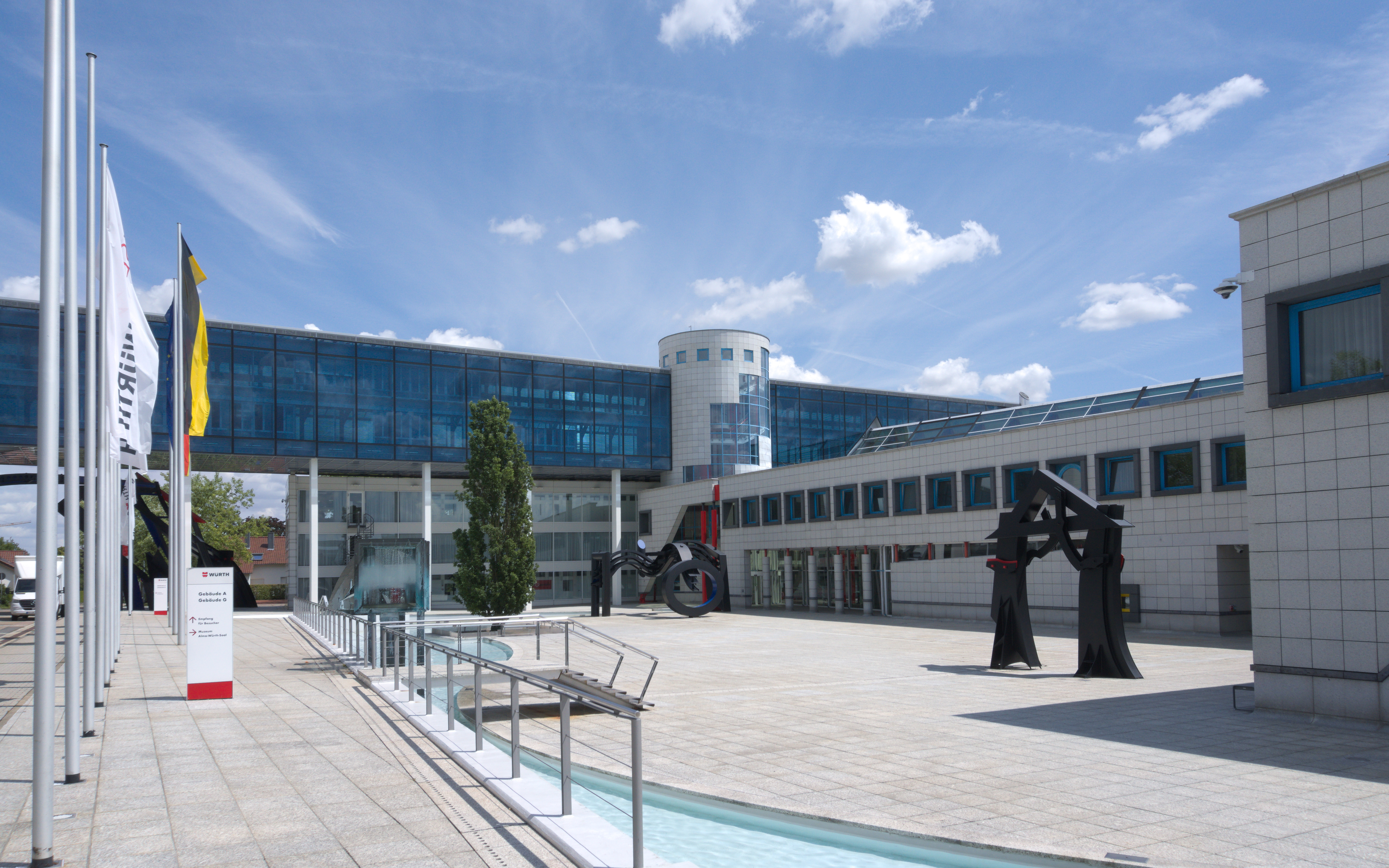
Outdoor view of the Museum Würth Künzelsau in 2023

The Würth Collection comprises over 18,000 works from the 15th century to modern and contemporary art, primarily paintings and sculptures. It ranks among the greatest European private art collections. The works of art are regularly displayed to the public in five museums in Germany and ten associated galleries of the Würth Group across Europe, including Kunsthalle Würth and Johanniterkirche in Schwäbisch Hall in Germany, Museum Würth and Museum Würth 2 in Künzelsau in Germany, the Art Forum Würth Capena in Italy, the Musée Würth France Erstein in France and the Museo Würth La Rioja in Spain. In Switzerland, Würth maintains Forum Würth Arlesheim, Forum Würth Chur and Würth Haus Rorschach. Admission is free in all of the museums.

=== Other ===
Würth is the organizer of the Würth Open-Air Festival, an annual music festival in Künzelsau. The Würth Philharmoniker orchestra was founded in Künzelsau in 2017 by Reinhold Würth Musikstiftung.

== Würth and sports ==
=== NASCAR ===
Beginning in the 2012 season, Würth became a primary sponsor in seven Nationwide Series races on the #12 Team Penske Dodge/Ford. From the 2014 season to the 2022 season, Würth was a primary sponsor in four NASCAR Cup Series races of Brad Keselowski of Team Penske's #2 Ford Fusion. As of the 2025 season, Würth currently is a primary sponsor for Penske's #12 and #22 in the NASCAR Cup Series for Ryan Blaney and Joey Logano's Ford Mustang.

In 2023, Würth became the title sponsor of the NASCAR Cup Series race at Dover Motor Speedway under the Würth 400.

On 23 January 2025, it was announced that the Würth 400 name would move over to Texas Motor Speedway under the Würth 400 Presented by LIQUI MOLY. The company also sponsored the No. 21 Wood Brothers Racing Mustang of Josh Berry.

=== Football ===
==== Bundesliga ====
Würth is an official partner of the German Football Association (DFB). Since 2022, the Würth brand has been featured at the international matches of the German men's national team, the women's national team, and the U21 team. In addition, Würth cooperates with ten clubs in the German Bundesliga: FC Bayern Munich, Borussia Dortmund, VfB Stuttgart, Bayer Leverkusen, Hertha BSC Berlin, RB Leipzig, Werder Bremen, SC Freiburg, Mainz 05, and Hamburger SV.

==== International ====
Würth has been sponsor on the uniforms of referees and their assistants in La Liga, Spain's premier football league for the last several years. Würth has also been sponsor on the uniform for icelandic top division club Fylkir since 2017 and French top division club RC Strasbourg Alsace.

=== Formula E ===
For the inaugural Formula E 2014 season, a new FIA championship for electrically powered cars, Würth Elektronik became technology partner to the only German racing team, ABT Schaeffler Audi Sport. The company's logo features on the nose of the team cars, in the pit garage, on team trucks and on all official communication. After the successful start of the racing season, Würth Elektronik extended its sponsorship agreement with ABT for a further three years.

=== V8 Supercars ===
Since the start of the 2015 season, Würth have been in a long term, strategic arrangement with V8 Supercars team, Dick Johnson Racing/Team Penske. The new livery was launched at the support race to the Australian Formula One Grand Prix with Marcos Ambrose as driver and Scott Pye forthwith racing in the colours in select races for the rest of the season.
