= Künzelsau =

- Town
- Coat of arms

- Location of Künzelsau within Hohenlohekreis district
- Interactive map of Künzelsau
- Location within Germany Location within Baden-Württemberg
- Coordinates: 49°17′N 9°41′E
- Country: Germany
- State: Baden-Württemberg
- Admin. region: Stuttgart
- District: Hohenlohekreis
- Subdivisions: 11

Government
  - Mayor (2018–26): Stefan Neumann

Area
  - Total: 75.17 km^{2} (29.02 sq mi)
- Elevation: 218 m (715 ft)

Population (2025-12-31)
  - Total: 16,457
  - Density: 218.9/km^{2} (567.0/sq mi)
- Time zone: UTC+01:00 (CET)
  - Summer (DST): UTC+02:00 (CEST)
- Postal codes: 74653
- Dialling codes: 07940
- Vehicle registration: KÜN, ÖHR
- Website: www.kuenzelsau.de

Künzelsau (German pronunciation: [ˈkʏntsl̩sˌʔaʊ]; East Franconian: Kinzelse) is a town in Baden-Württemberg, in south central Germany. It is the capital of the Hohenlohe district. It is located on the river Kocher, 19 km (12 mi) north of Schwäbisch Hall, and 37 km (23 mi) northeast of Heilbronn.

== Geography ==
The city of Künzelsau is located, at elevation 210–435 m (689–1,427 ft), along the Kocher River, a right tributary of the Neckar River, some 40 km east (25 mi) of Heilbronn. The city is, after Öhringen, the second largest city of the Hohenlohe district, whose seat it is.

The Hohenlohe district was created on 1 January 1973 by merging the former districts of Künzelsau (KÜN) and Öhringen (ÖHR). The city of Künzelsau thus retained being the district seat, so that the license plate number still uses KÜN. Künzelsau is one of seven centers in the region Heilbronn-Franken within the administrative district of Stuttgart.

=== City arrangement ===
The city of Künzelsau is located in the valley (elevation 218 m) and is surrounded by the higher-lying towns: Amrichshausen (401 m), Belsenberg (256 m) (with the parts Rodachshof and Siegelhof), Gaisbach (381 m) (with the hamlets Etzlinsweiler, Haag, Kemmeten, Oberhof, Unterhof and Weckhof and the farmstead Schnaihof), Garnberg (404 m), Kocherstetten (254 m) (with hamlet Schloß Stetten and farmsteads Bienenhof and Buchenmühle), Laßbach (with villages Mäusdorf and Vogelsberg and 3 farmsteads Falkenhof, Kügelhof and Rappoldsweiler Hof) (435 m), Morsbach (223 m), Nagelsberg (312 m), Nitzenhausen (431 m) (with hamlets Berndshausen and Sonnhofen), Ohrenbach (430 m), Steinbach (412 m) (with 3 hamlets Büttelbronn, Ohrenbach and Wolfsölden) - the data in each case in meters above sea level. Belonging to Künzelsau before the municipal reform of the 1970s were: the city Künzelsau, the villages of Garnberg and Nagelberg, and residential places Gaisbacher Rank and Hofratsmühle.

In the urban area of Künzelsau are several assigned areas (to former municipalities assigned): Neugreut to Amrichshausen, chapel of the Holy Cross to Belsenberg, Hefenhofen, Herborten, Steinbach, Gackstatt and Schupperg to Gaisbach, Baldehofen, Kronhofen, Webern, Wartturm of the Burg Zarge to Künzelsau, Alosweiler, Bole oder Bohel, Hitels (in Vogelsberg), Schätzlinshof and Schlothof to Laßbach, the named Heidenschlößchen to Morsbach, as well as Holderbach, Dörrenhof, Klingen and Wilhelmshaus to Steinbach [2].

The district area is 75.17 km, including all parts of the city square.

=== Climate ===
Climate data for Künzelsau (1991-2020)
Month	Jan	Feb	Mar	Apr	May	Jun	Jul	Aug	Sep	Oct	Nov	Dec	Year
Daily mean °C (°F)	1.4 (34.5)	2.1 (35.8)	5.9 (42.6)	10.4 (50.7)	14.4 (57.9)	17.8 (64.0)	19.6 (67.3)	19.2 (66.6)	14.8 (58.6)	10.0 (50.0)	5.3 (41.5)	2.3 (36.1)	10.3 (50.5)
Average precipitation mm (inches)	67.7 (2.67)	56.7 (2.23)	64.5 (2.54)	45.8 (1.80)	74.0 (2.91)	67.1 (2.64)	75.0 (2.95)	66.1 (2.60)	61.0 (2.40)	68.7 (2.70)	69.4 (2.73)	82.2 (3.24)	798.2 (31.41)
Mean monthly sunshine hours	52.5	80.2	132.8	188.1	215.1	228.3	242	227.5	166.7	108.1	54.8	41.7	1,737.8
Source: Deutscher Wetterdienst

== History ==
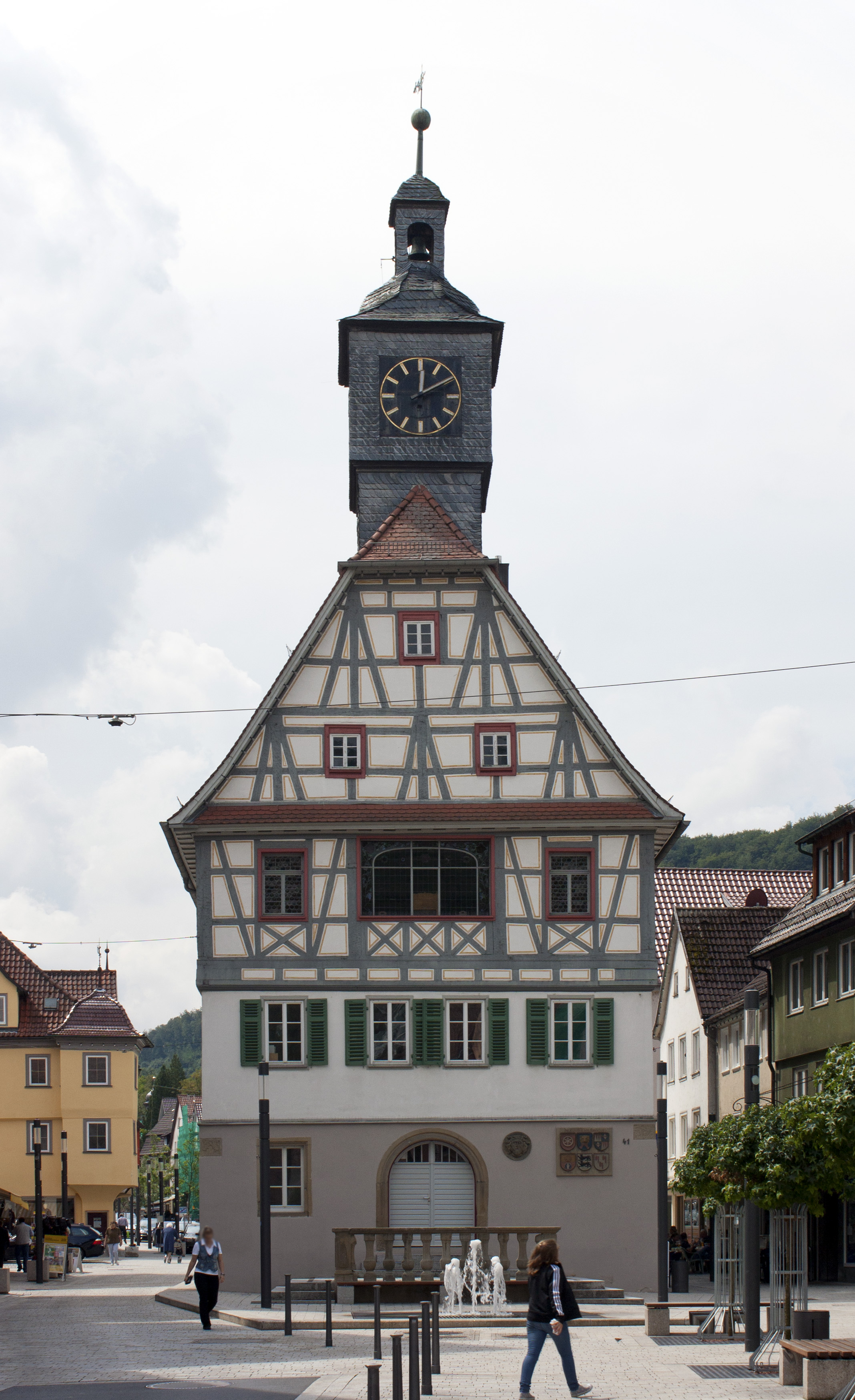
The old Rathaus of Künzelsau

It was first documented in the year 1098 as Künzelsau. Until 1802, the city was under a Ganerbengemeinschaft, which consisted of a varying number of members. In 1806 Künzelsau along with the Principality of Hohenlohe was joined to the Kingdom of Württemberg. In 1811 Künzelsau became the seat of the higher administrative division of the same name (since 1938: Künzelsau District). In 1892, the railway station was inaugurated in Künzelsau.

Künzelsau was, in the late 18th and early 19th century, the centre point of emigration to the UK of pork butchers. The pioneers noticed a niche for speciality pork products in the rapidly growing English cities, especially those in the industrial north. Most married local women, but sent word home that a good living could be made in England, and others followed.

In 1948, L. Hermann clothes factory (now the Mustang apparel Werke GmbH + Co. KG), produced the first jeans in Germany.

In 1973, with the district reform, the former county seat of the district Künzelsau, became county seat of the new Hohenlohe district, which includes the old-district Öhringen and a small part of the old-district Buchen.

=== Religions ===
The Protestant Reformation was introduced to Künzelsau in 1556. The city is therefore predominantly Protestant. Since the move here from Ingelfingen in 1824/25, it has been the seat of the deanery of the Evangelical Lutheran Church in Württemberg (see Church District Künzelsau). Evangelical congregations can be found in Belsenberg, Kocherstetten, Künzelsau and Morsbach, which include most Protestants from the other districts. Only the Protestants of the districts Berndshausen, Nitzenhausen and Wolf Sölden belong to the church community Buchenbach (community Mulfingen).

The formerly independent Catholic parishes of Künzelsau, Nagelsberg, Kupferzell and Amrichshausen have been combined to the pastoral care unit of Künzelsau.

Besides the two large churches in Künzelsau, there exist a New Apostolic Church (with churches in Künzelsau Gaisbach), a congregation of Jehovah's Witnesses (Kingdom Hall in Gaisbach), a Greek Orthodox church, the Pentecostal-charismatic missionary community committed Christian from the Federation of Pentecostal Churches, and other Christian denominations.

After the entry of Jews in the 14th century, and evidence of a historic Jewish cemetery in Künzelsau created a modern Jewish community in Künzelsau until the late 19th century, especially by the influx of Jews from Nagelberg. The Jewish community was first called "Nagelberg-Künzelsau", then "Künzelsau-Nagelberg" and finally just "Künzelsau" from 1900. The Künzelsau synagogue was opened in 1907, but it was destroyed during the November Pogrom in 1938.[3]

The town's Jewish community shrank rapidly during the persecution of Jews at the time of National Socialism (Nazism). Some members of the community were able to flee the country and live abroad, but the majority were arrested, deported and ended up in death camps. Only the merchant Sigbert Baer outlasted the era of the Third Reich in Künzelsau.

=== Population development ===
Year	1800	1830	1910	1939	1951	1960	1981	1998	2000	2005
Population	2,000	2,500	3,067	3,950	5,250	7,605	11,565	14,125	14,819	15,032

=== Annexations ===
- 1 April 1912: Garnberg
- 1 October 1937: Nagelsberg
- 1 January 1972: Amrichshausen, Belsenberg, Kocherstetten, Laßbach, Nitzenhausen and Steinbach
- 1 April 1972: Gaisbach
- 1 January 1973: Morsbach
- 1 January 1977: Ort Sonnhofen

== Politics ==
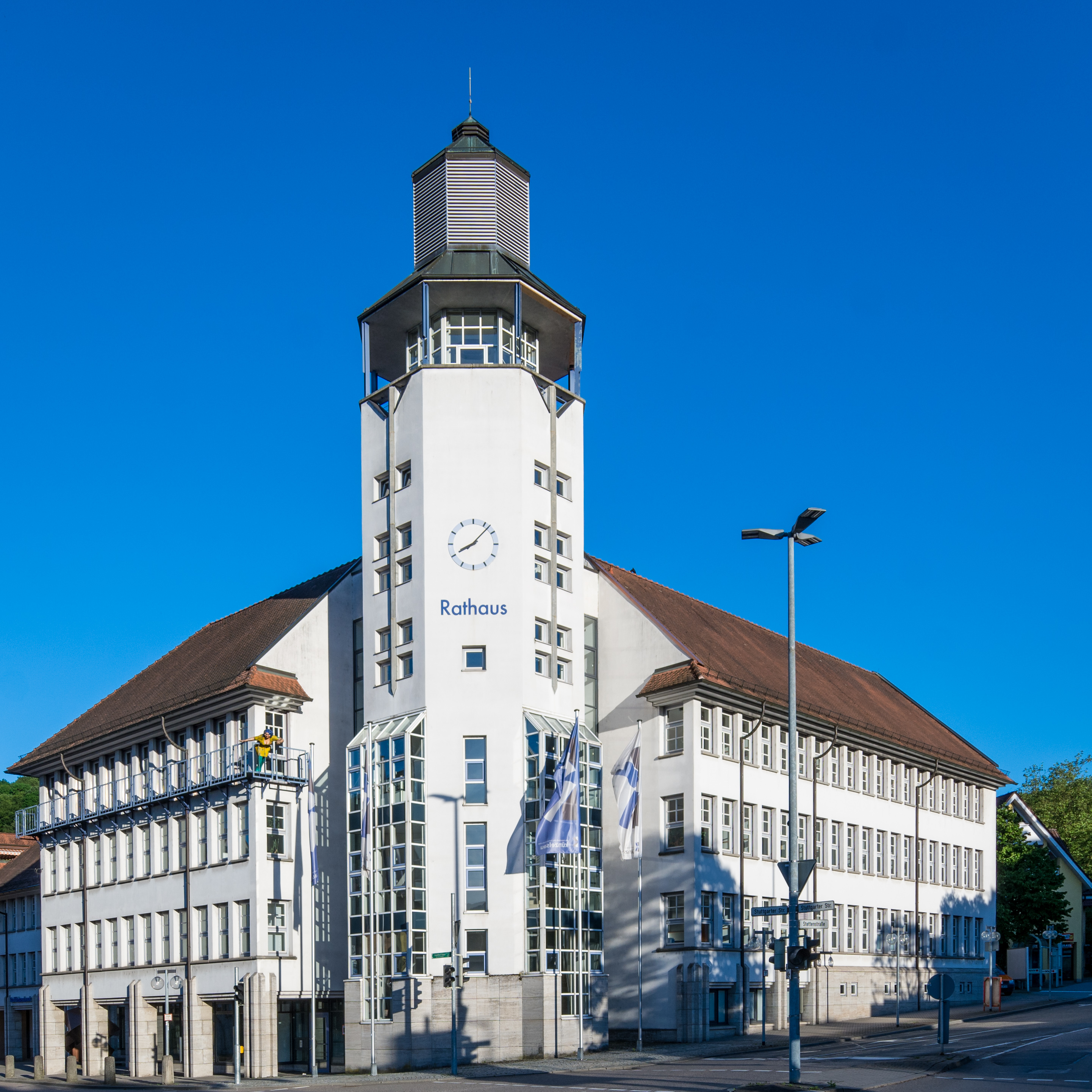
The new Rathaus of Künzelsau

=== Town council ===
The Kommunalwahl for 2009 had the following seats, as percentages in the town council:

CDU	35.4%	-4.6	9 seats	-5
UBK	27.0%	+3.8	7 seats	-1
SPD	23.0%	+4.1	6 seats	±0
Die Freien	14.6%	-3.2	4 seats	-2
Andere	0.0%	-2.8	0 seats	±0

Through the abolition of loggerheads in local elections, the council was reduced from 34 to 26 seats.

=== Mayor ===
The mayor is directly elected for eight years. In the 2011 election, Stefan Neumann won. He replaced Volker Lenz on 1 September 2011, who had served since 1986.

=== Coat of arms and flag ===

The blazon of Kuenzel Auer coat of arms is: on an azure background, a silver plate, with the bearded golden head of John the Baptist. The city flag is blue and white.

The severed head of John the Baptist, Patron of the Church of Künzelsau, was first used on seals of Künzelsau starting in 1525. The colors of the flag were probably set in the 18th or 19th century.

=== Sister cities ===
Künzelsau has, since 1992, developed partnerships with the city Marcali in Hungary.

== Economy and infrastructure ==
=== Transport ===
The main traffic artery of Künzelsau is federal highway B 19, which comes from the northern town of Bad Mergentheim through the Künzelsau district of Nagelberg to the Kocher, crosses Künzelsau, climbs out of the valley leaves again and then runs via Künzelsau-south towards Schwäbisch Hall and Gaildorf. In the southern neighboring community of Kupferzell, the B 19 connects to the Autobahn A 6 to Heilbronn to the west and to Nuremberg to the east. Künzelsau is connected by state and district roads with the places in the Kocher valley and the surrounding plateaus.

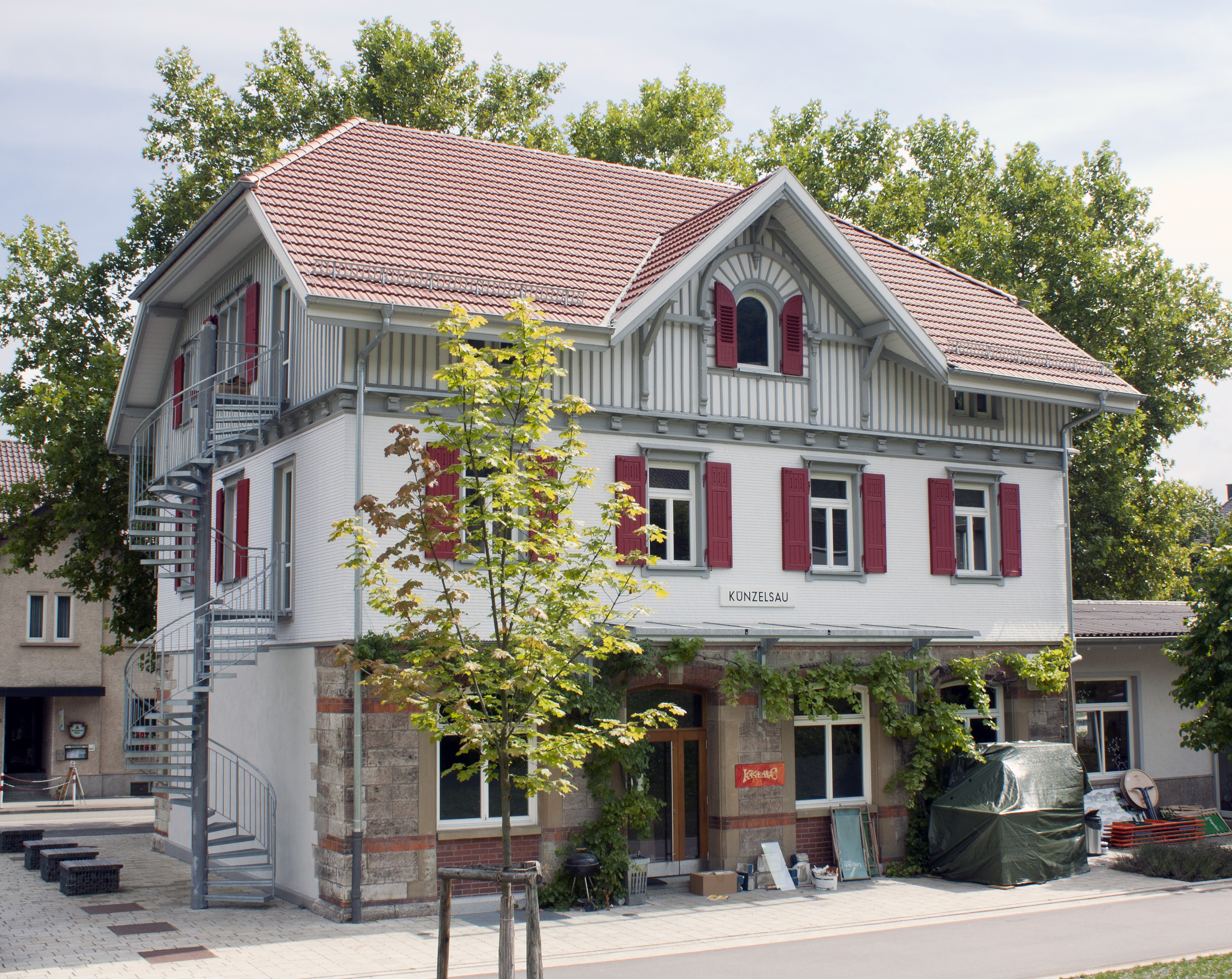
Künzelsau train station

Künzelsau is no longer connected to the railway network. The city had acquired a connection to the rail system in 1892. When the Royal Württemberg State Railways opened the Kocher Valley Railway from Waldenburg to Künzelsau, it also built a station in Haag with a type I entrance building. The line was extended to Forchtenberg in 1924, giving Nagelberg a railway connection. In 1981, passenger services to Hohenlohe were closed in 1991, and this was followed by total closure of the line. Much of the former railway line was converted to a paved bike path that leads up to the level of Hohenlohe. As the end of 2008, it was announced that reopening of the railway section between Künzelsau and Waldenburg was being examined as part of the Heilbronn Stadtbahn.

Since 1999, in town, the Künzelsauer Bergbahn funicular railway has connected the main housing Taläcker in the Hohenlohe level with the core city Kocher.

=== Local businesses ===
Künzelsau is home to several global companies of the sectors assembly parts (distributors), ventilation systems, support equipment, and textiles (jeans).

- Berner AG, supplies and tools for industry and trade
- Mustang apparel Werke GmbH + Co. KG
- P + V GmbH, precision and connection technology
- Rosenberg GmbH, ventilation/air conditioning/fan manufacture
- STAHL GmbH, conveying
- Würth Group, assembly technology
- Ziehl-Abegg, drive, fans and control technology.

The savings bank of Hohenlohe district is based in Künzelsau, and Volksbank Hohenlohe here operates a main office. In addition, other national banks maintain branches in Künzelsau.

=== Viticulture ===
In Künzelsau, wine production is operated on a small scale. The local region belongs to the main region Kocherberg in the Jagst-Kocher-Tauber area. A few have Belsenberg with the plan of Heilig Kreuz.

=== Courts and agencies ===
Künzelsau has a district court, which belongs to the District Court of Heilbronn and the Higher Regional Court of Stuttgart.

The city is home to the church district Künzelsau, the Evangelical Lutheran Church in Württemberg, and the Hohenlohe deanery of Rottenburg-Stuttgart.

The fire department of Künzelsau acts as base for firefighters in their surrounding communities Ingelfingen, Kupferzell, Mulfingen, Niedernhall and Weißbach, as well as the Hohenlohe industrial park in Waldenburg. It provides for large fires on the plan and has major technical assistance. In addition, it provides special services for the entire Hohenlohe district.

=== Education ===
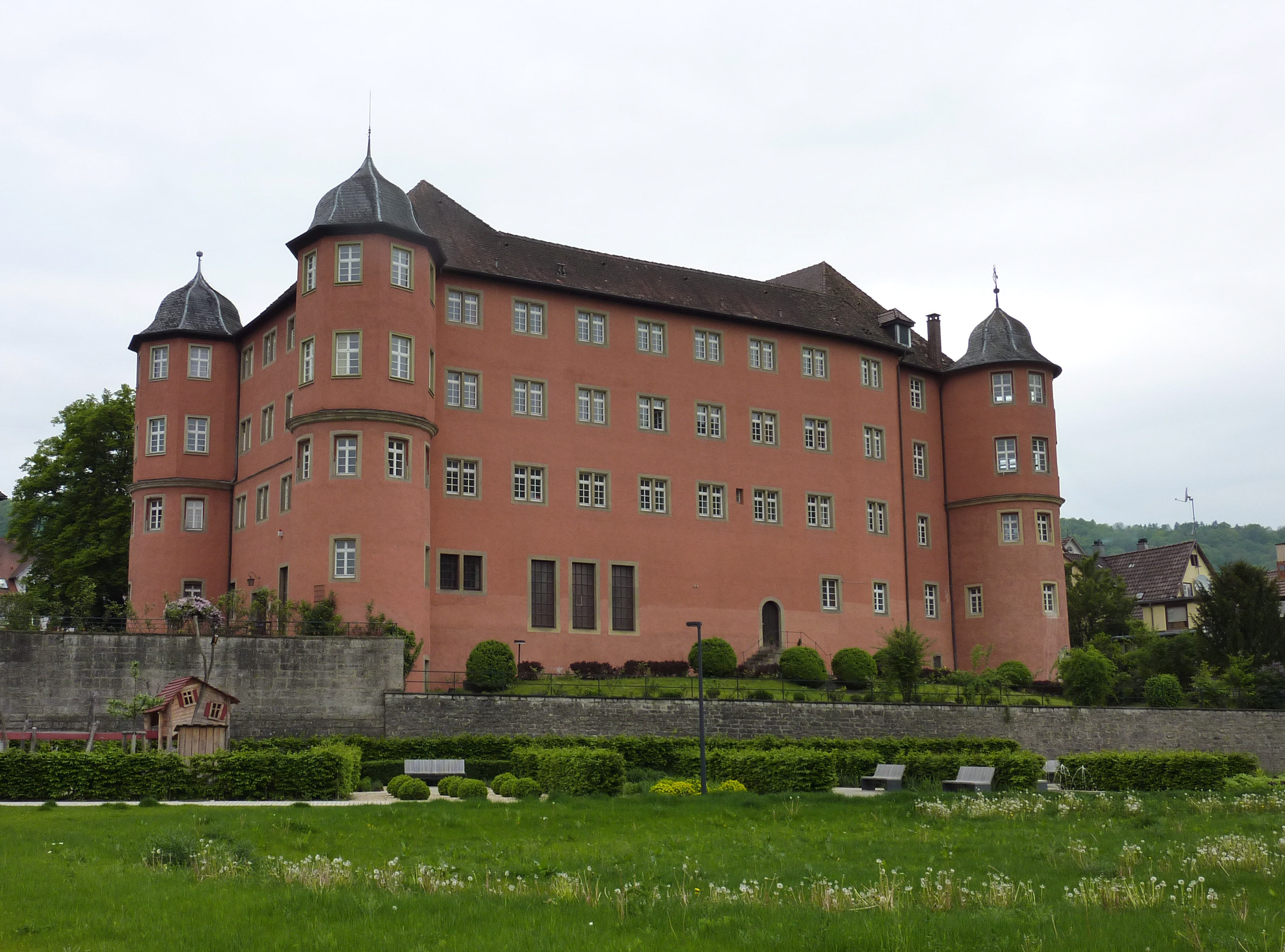
Künzelsau Castle, today, a boarding school

Outside the city-limits of Künzelsau, since 1988 a branch of the University of Heilbronn is located in the district of Hofratsmühle, comprising the departments of electrical engineering, industrial engineering, business studies and media, product, customer management, business administration, sports, cultural and leisure-time management, and since the winter semester 2007/2008, of energy management. About 1300 students (SS 06) study here at the present. In 2005, the college was renamed the Reinhold Würth University of the University of Heilbronn.

The city of Künzelsau is the provider of basic and secondary school in Künzelsau. There are four primary schools in the districts Amrichshausen, Gaisbach (Reinhold-Würth-Schule), Kocherstetten und Taläcker, Georg-Wagner-secondary school, the Brothers Grimm School (special school) and Ganerben-Gymnasium. The Hohenlohe district has been awarded the Geschwister-Scholl-Schule (school for mentally disabled), the Erich-Kästner-Schule (school for speech impaired) and the three professional schools: Gewerbliche Schule, Kaufmännische Schule and Hauswirtschaftliche Schule (Karoline-Breitinger-Schule).

The state of Baden-Württemberg became recipient of the Schloss-gymnasium, a postgraduate school with boarding. There is also a public high school and a youth music school.

The Würth Group, in the school year 2006/2007, opened a private school named Freie Schule Anne-Sophie (named after a childhood deceased daughter of Bettina Würth). The full-day operation will be taught students in grades one through eight. An extension to the class ten is provided. In the section Taläcker, during the 2008/2009 school year, a private school operated.

=== Sports and leisure facilities ===
The Kocher is the only river open for swimming in Baden-Wuerttemberg. The sports facilities in "Prübling" offer the sports stadium, a barn, tennis courts and gym. Soccer fields are located in different areas. On the southwestern ridge of Künzelsau, near the residential area got its fair, there are fitness and nature trails.

== Culture and sights ==
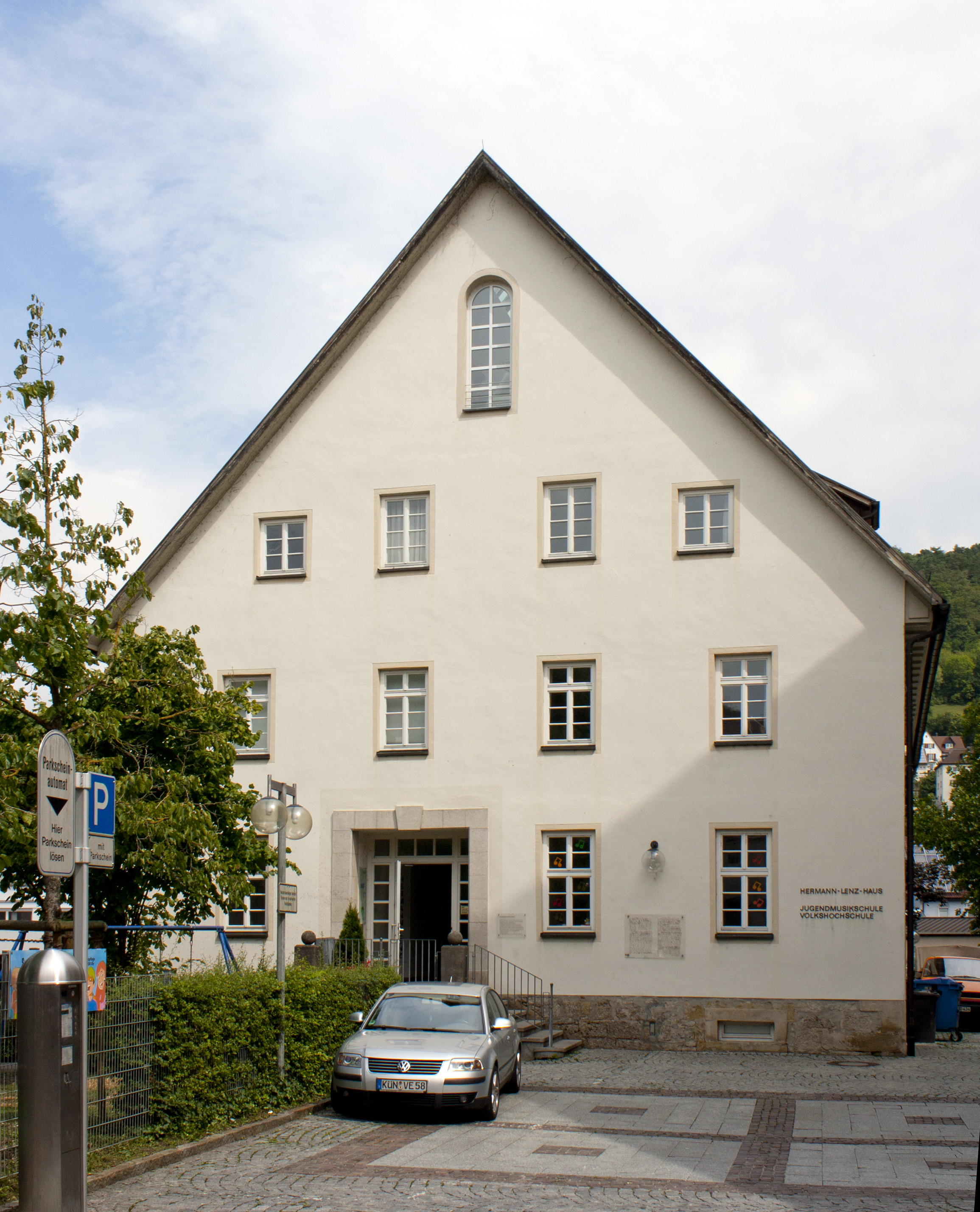
House of Hermann Lenz

=== Museums ===
The Würth Museum in the district and the Gaisbach Hirschwirtscheuer in the city are devoted to contemporary art. The Hohenlohe Art Association also operates an art gallery since November 2008 at the Kocher bridge. In 2007 was the 75th anniversary of a museum for the future of the Mustang apparel Werke GmbH & Co. KG was established in Founders House.

=== Structures ===
The Old Town Hall from the 16th century was built on the Künsbach.

Located at Keltergasse 63 is the home of the writer Hermann Lenz. The building dates from the 18th century.

=== Youth facilities ===
At the old train station is the youth cultural-society Kokolores. Other rooms in the same building are used by the Youth Council Künzelsau and a branch of the music school. Near the fire station of Künzelsau is the Jugendzentrum (youth center). In the town section Taläcker, there is a youth block house.

== Notable residents ==
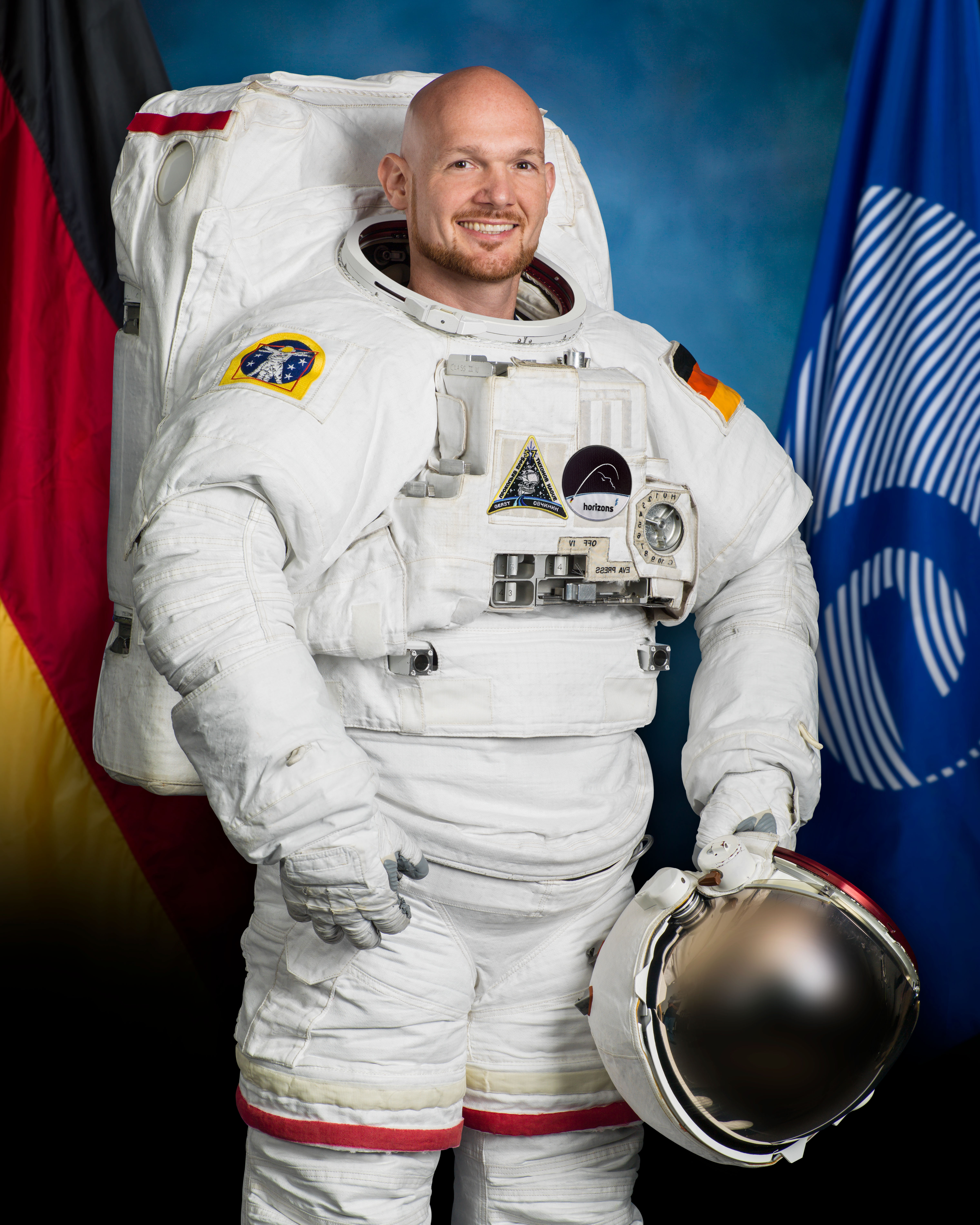
Alexander Gerst, 2017

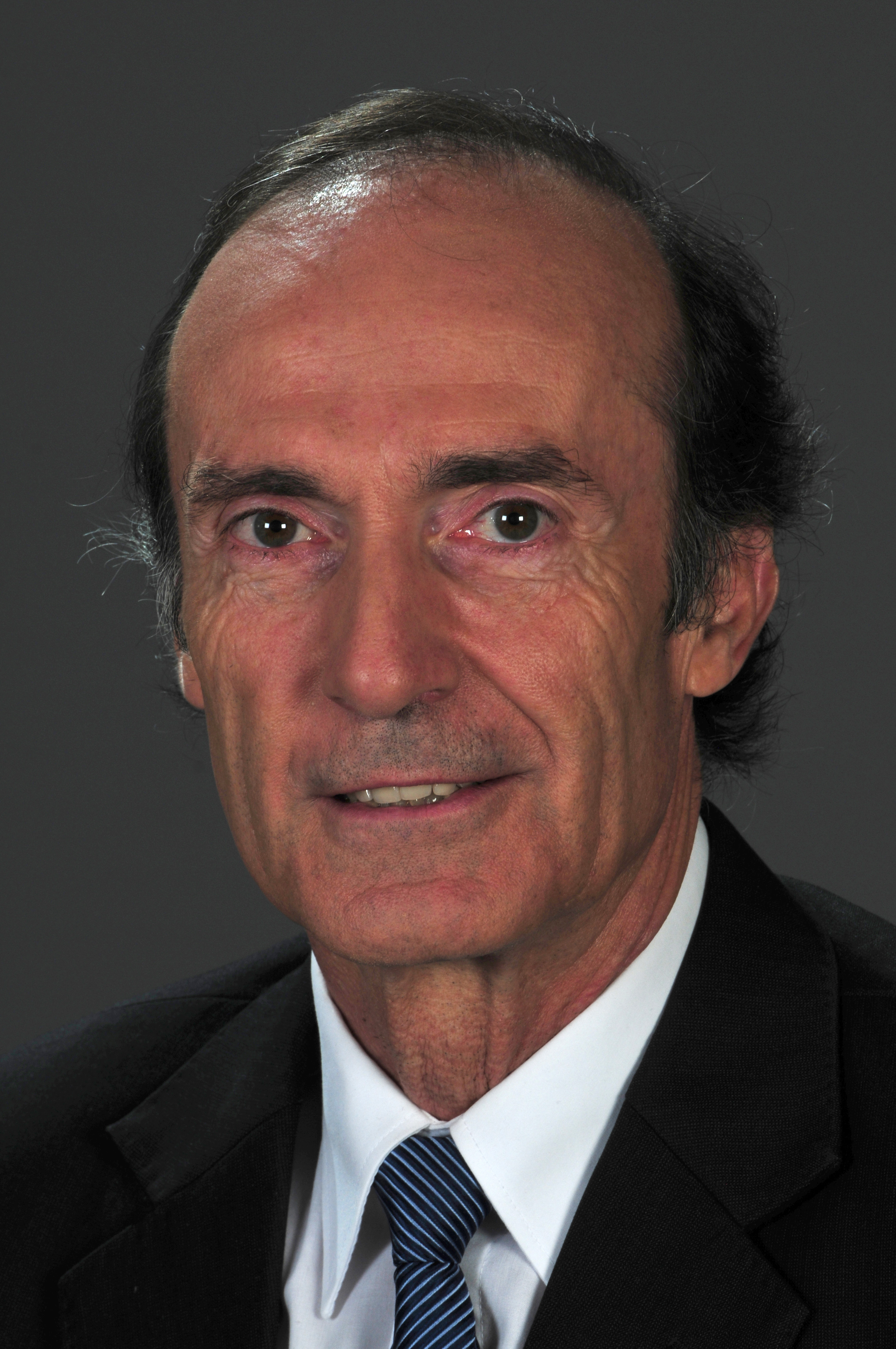
Eberhard Gienger, 2014

- Johann Heinrich Schüle, (DE Wiki) (1720–1811), inventor
- Karl Hirzel, (DE Wiki) (1808–1874), classical philosopher
- Adolf Hirzel, (DE Wiki) (1809–1898), politician
- August Beyer, (DE Wiki) (1834–1899), master builder
- Karoline Breitinger (1851–1932), first female doctor of Württemberg
- Wilhelm Schmid (1859–1951), classical philosopher
- Georg Albrecht, (DE Wiki) (1881–1964), historian
- Georg Wagner, (DE Wiki) (1885–1972), geologist
- Hermann Lenz (1913–1998), writer, poet, grew up locally until aged 11
- Walter Haeussermann (1914–2010), aerospace engineer, with Team Wernher von Braun
- Albert Berner, (DE Wiki) (born 1935), founder of Albert Berner GmbH, (DE Wiki)
- Reinhold Würth (born 1935), owner of Würth. lives locally
- Hans Wall, (DE Wiki) (born 1942-2019), founder of Hans Wall AG, (DE Wiki)
- Alexander Gerst (born 1976), geophysicist and European Space Agency astronaut
- Valentin Abel (born 1991), politician (FDP), Member of the Bundestag

=== Sport ===
- Hans Klenk (1919–2009), racing driver
- Eberhard Gienger (born 1951), world champion in Horizontal bar gymnastics, politician (CDU) and member of the Bundestag
- Kevin Conrad (born 1990), retired footballer, played nearly 300 games
- Pascal Sohm (born 1991), footballer who has played over 300 games
