= Schöntal Abbey =

Abbey in Germany

Coordinates: 49°19′41″N 9°30′17″E

Imperial Abbey of Schöntal Reichskloster Schöntal
- 1418–1495
- Coat of arms

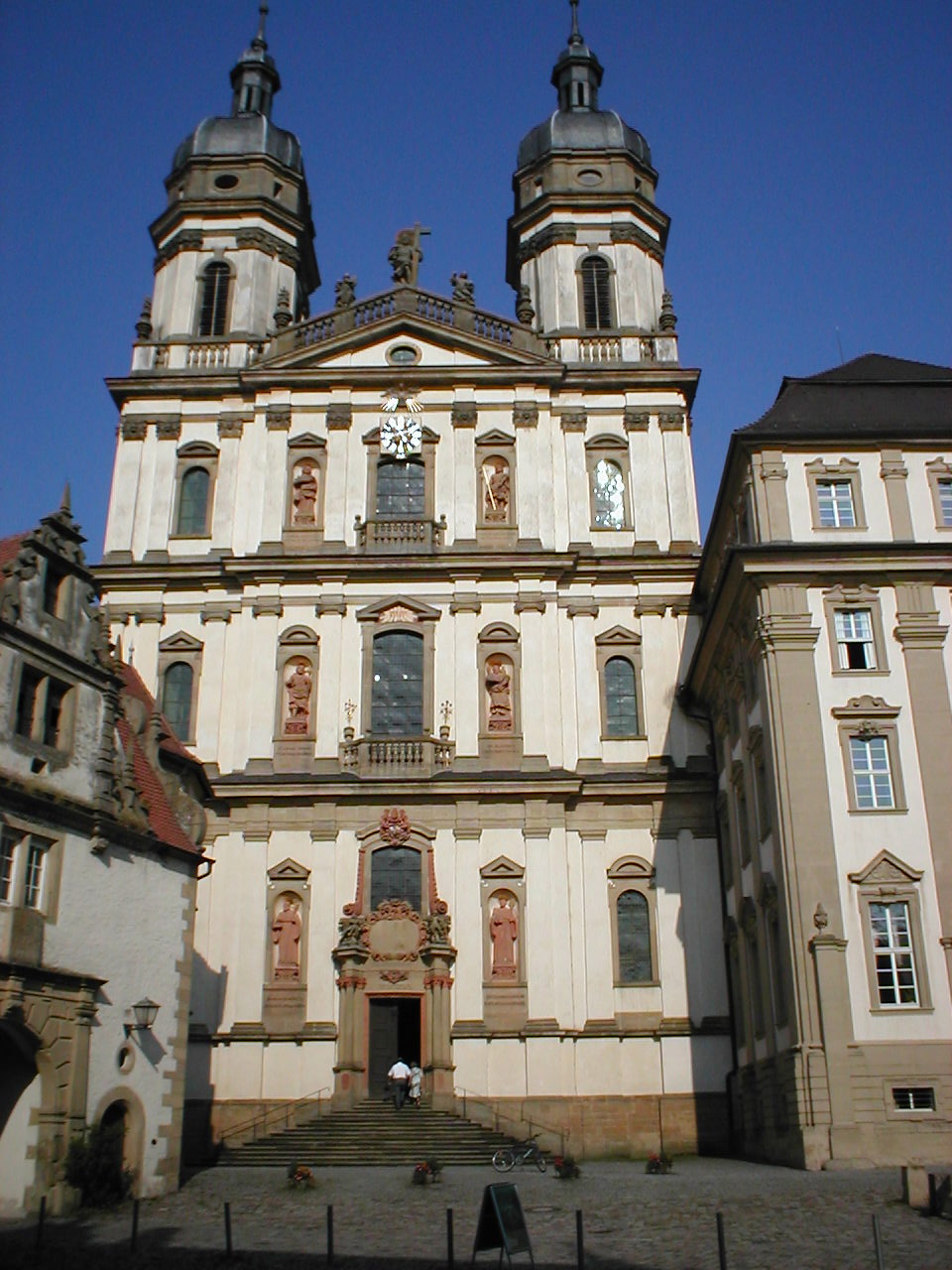
- Schöntal Abbey: Baroque abbey church
- Status: Imperial Abbey of the Holy Roman Empire
- Capital: Schöntal
- Government: Elective principality
- Historical era: Middle Ages
  - Founded in Neusass: 1153
  - Relocated to Schöntal: 1157–63
  - Pawned to Kaisheim Abbey: early 1200s – 1283
  - Council of Constance granted Reichsfreiheit: 1418
  - Reichsfreiheit revoked: 1495
  - Abandoned during Thirty Years' War: 1631
  - Revived and expanded: 1683–1782
  - Secularised to Württemberg: 1802
Preceded by	Succeeded by
Maulbronn Abbey	Maulbronn Abbey

Schöntal Abbey (German: Kloster Schöntal, Reichskloster Schöntal) is a former Cistercian abbey in Schöntal in the district of Hohenlohe, Baden-Württemberg, Germany. It is famous as one of the most impressive pieces of Baroque architecture in northern Württemberg and is now used by the Diocese of Rottenburg-Stuttgart as a retreat and training centre.

== History ==
The Cistercian monastery was founded in 1153 in Neusass by Wolfram von Bebenburg and was settled by monks from Maulbronn Abbey. The original site proved unsuitable and the new community moved to the present location in Schöntal on the Jagst between 1157 and 1163. The land for the new site was provided by the von Berlichingen family in exchange for rights of burial in the monastery. The monastery was under the protection of the Bishops of Würzburg.

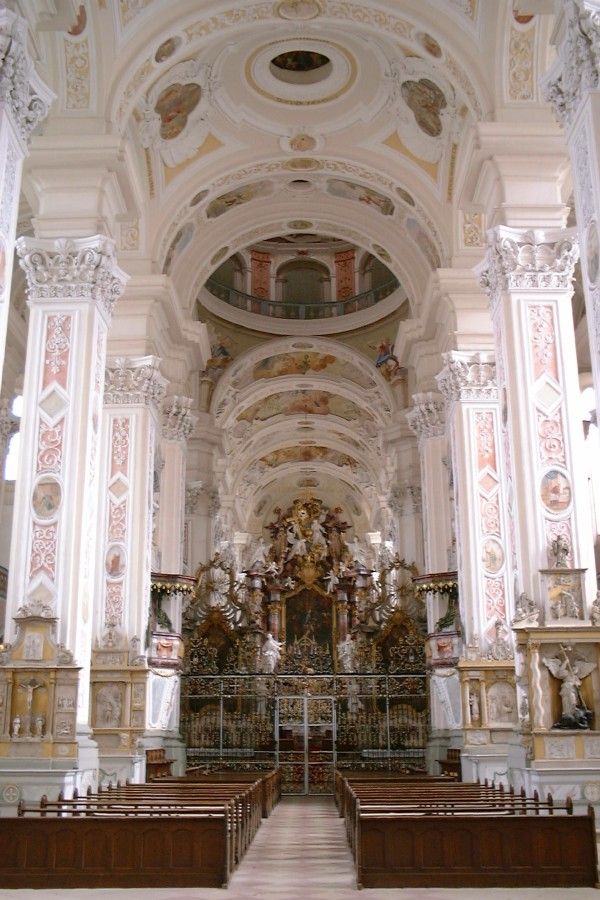
Abbey church: interior

Despite a promising beginning, the abbey found itself in financial difficulties by the early 13th century. Maulbronn Abbey was also in financial trouble and gave Schöntal to Kaisheim Abbey, which settled its debts in 1283.

After this, Schöntal made a recovery, and in 1418 at the Council of Constance was granted the status of Imperial abbey, although it only retained this until 1495. It was plundered several times and suffered severe damage during the German Peasants' War in 1525. Although it survived the Reformation the buildings became uninhabitable and an emergency block had to be constructed in 1617–18, now known as the Alte Abtei ("old abbey"). The monastery was besieged during the Thirty Years' War and the monks were eventually forced to flee in 1631, abandoning what remained of the buildings to looting and plunder. In 1648 the premises were several times used as soldiers' billets.

The abbey finally experienced a revival under abbot Benedikt Knittel (in office from 1683 to 1732). Under his leadership was built the Baroque abbey church, designed by Leonhard Dientzenhofer, in which Götz von Berlichingen is buried. Abbot Benedikt was also responsible for the palatial claustral buildings with the grand staircase by Balthasar Neumann. Some forty monks lived in the community, besides about thirty conversi or lay brothers, who lived outside the monastery while following a monastic way of life.

The abbey was secularised in 1802, when it was taken over by the Kingdom of Württemberg. The furnishings and contents were removed to Stuttgart, and the buildings used initially for the accommodation of local government administration. From 1810 to 1975, Schöntal Abbey was one of the buildings used for the Evangelical Theological Seminary (Evangelisch-theologisches Seminar or Seminar Maulbronn), now the Evangelical Seminaries of Maulbronn and Blaubeuren.

Today the buildings are used by the Diocese of Rottenburg-Stuttgart as a centre for conferences, retreats and training, as well as the town hall of the community of Schöntal.

Most of the Baroque buildings and the monastery gardens have survived.

== Sources and references ==
- (in German) Schöntal Abbey website
- (in German) Schöntal Abbey church website
- (in German) Klöster in Baden-Württemberg: Zisterzienserabtei Schöntal
- Württembergisches Klosterbuch, p. 433 ff. Thorbecke Ostfildern 2003, ISBN 3-7995-0220-3
- H. Hummel: Kloster Schöntal, Schöntal 1991
- J. Brümmer: Kunst und Herrschaftsanspruch. Abt Benedikt Knittel (1650–1732) und sein Wirken im Zisterzienserkloster Schöntal (Forschungen aus Württembergisch Franken 40), Sigmaringen 1994
- M. M. Rückert: Von der frommen Adelsstiftung zur reichsunmittelbaren Abtei: Kloster Schöntal in den ersten 250 Jahren seines Bestehens, in: D. R. Bauer (ed.): Unter Beobachtung der heiligen Regel. Zisterziensische Spiritualität und Kultur im baden-württembergischen Franken (Forschungen aus Württembergisch Franken 48)., Stuttgart 2002, pp. 25–38
