= Zweiflingen =

- Municipality
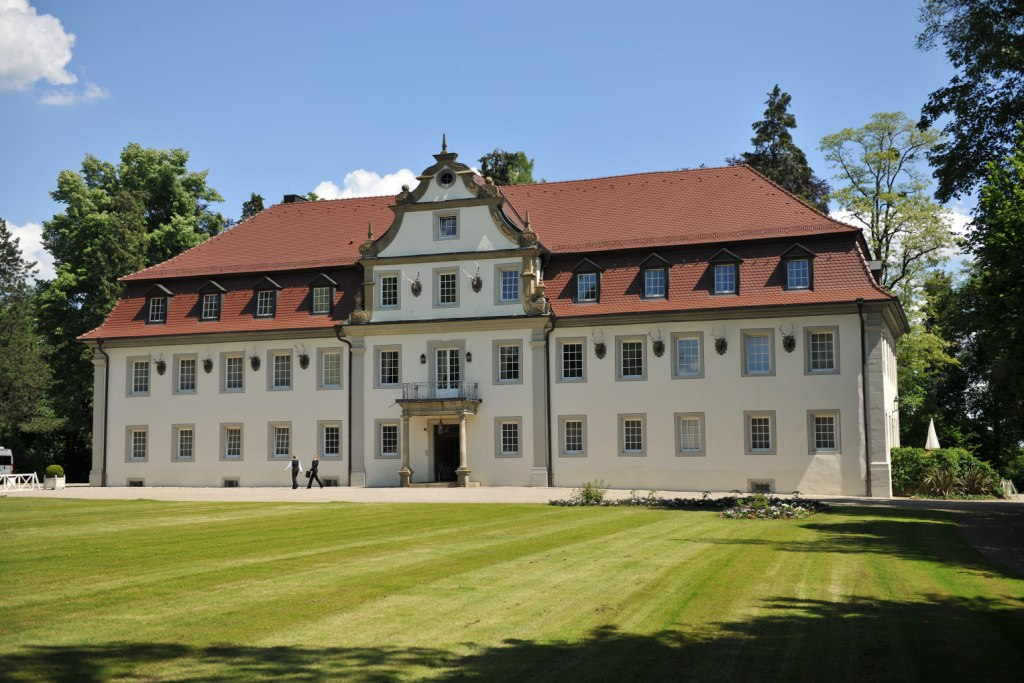
- Hunting lodge Friedrichsruhe

- Coat of arms

- Location of Zweiflingen within Hohenlohekreis district
- Interactive map of Zweiflingen
- Location within Germany Location within Baden-Württemberg
- Coordinates: 49°15′N 9°31′E
- Country: Germany
- State: Baden-Württemberg
- Admin. region: Stuttgart
- District: Hohenlohekreis
- Subdivisions: 7

Government
  - Mayor (2018–26): Klaus Gross

Area
  - Total: 32.1 km^{2} (12.4 sq mi)
- Elevation: 308 m (1,010 ft)

Population (2025-12-31)
  - Total: 1,817
  - Density: 56.6/km^{2} (147/sq mi)
- Time zone: UTC+01:00 (CET)
  - Summer (DST): UTC+02:00 (CEST)
- Postal codes: 74639
- Dialling codes: 07948
- Vehicle registration: KÜN, ÖHR
- Website: www.zweiflingen.de

Zweiflingen (German pronunciation: [ˈtsvaɪflɪŋən]) is the smallest town in the district of Hohenlohe in Baden-Württemberg in Germany.

== History ==
Zweiflingen's history traces back to the 11th century. Today, it consists of 7 villages.

=== Eichach ===
Populated since 1037, it was then called Eichehe. The name changed to Eichech in 1357, to Aichach in 1672 and later to its current version. It is probably named after the german word of the Oak tree, "Eiche". Its border with Sindringen (today part of Forchtenberg) was defined in 1575. In 1672, Eichach consisted of 23 houses and 10 barns. 18 Houses were destroyed because of the Thirty Years' War. In 1819, there were 28 residential houses and 26 other buildings.

Today, Eichach has a population of around 164, and is therefore the second-smallest village in Zweiflingen. A well-preserved tower in the middle is occasionally used to host exhibitions.

=== Friedrichsruhe ===
In 1612, Kraft of Hohenlohe-Neuenstein, built a zoological garden for fallow deer and a hunting lodge. It was mostly destroyed in the Thirty Years' War. His oldest son, Johann Friedrich I of Hohenlohe-Öhringen) started reconstructing the zoological garden in 1651. The currently standing hunting lodge was built from 1712 to 1717 by Johann Friedrich II of Hohenlohe-Öhringen, Kraft's grand-son, as an improvement from the hunting lodge built near Platzhof a century beforehand. Following plans originating to 1719, the property was split among 9 farmers in 1738. In remembrance of Johann Friedrich II the name Friedrichsruhe came up in 1750. In 1819, the settlement had grown to 21 residential houses and 13 other buildings. Today Friedrichsruhe's population stands at 332, which makes it one of the biggest villages of Zweiflingen.

=== Orendelsall ===
Probably created in the 8th century by people from Wülfingen (Forchtenberg), the village consisted of 34 residential houses and 34 other buildings in 1819.

The settlement developed near an old crossing point (“Sallübergang”) and lay along historic routes connecting Wülfingen, Öhringen, Ohrnberg, and Schwäbisch Hall.

During the Middle Ages, the village passed through several changes in lordship, belonging in the early 14th century to the Counts of Dürn, later to Würzburg authorities, and partly to Kloster Schöntal before eventually coming fully under Württemberg following secularisation in 1802; from 1810 it was administered within the Oberamt Öhringen.

As part of 20th-century administrative reforms, Orendelsall—together with Westernbach—was incorporated into the municipality of Zweiflingen on 1 April 1972. Today it remains a rural locality within the agricultural landscape characteristic of the Hohenlohe region.

=== Pfahlbach ===
Pfahlbach was first mentioned in 795. The name comes from the Germanic name of the Limes, which Pfahlbach was built next to. Throughout its history, the name has evolved: first appearing as Phalbach (in 795 and 1037), transitioning to Pfolbach by 1357, and eventually settling as Pfahlbach in 1672. The village consisted of 16 houses and 13 barns in 1672. In 1819 there were 34 residential houses and 21 other buildings. Today, it has a population of 120, which makes it the smallest village in Zweiflingen.

=== Tiefensall ===
The village of Tiefensall was probably created in the 11th or 12th century, as it was first documented as Thieffensalle in 1231. Historical versions of the name include Tieffensalle (1357) and Dieffensall (1702). The name derives from the river Sall. A chapel in southern Tiefensall that stands to this day was built in 1499. 18 residential houses and 14 barns were counted in 1702. In 1819, there were 29 residential houses and 25 other buildings. Today, Tierensall has a population of around 190.

=== Westernbach ===
Westernbach has its origins in an early Roman settlement from the second century, of which almost nothing remains today. In 1037, two different settlements named Westernbach were mentioned, which are identical to the settlements of Upper Westernbach and Lower Westernbach (mentioned in 1505 and 1595), the two hamlets that make up Westernbach today. The current population of Westernbach is 255.

=== Zweiflingen ===
Zweiflingen, which is the town's main village, was first mentioned in 1230, but is thought to have originated from a germanic settlement from around 500. Throughout the years, the village's name evolved: Zwivelingen in 1230, Zwifelingen in 1354, Zwiflingen 1357, and Zweifflingen 1672. Its borders with Orendelsall were disputed in the 16th century until they were set in 1577. In 1672, the village consisted of 29 houses and 24 barns. In 1819, there were 45 houses and 36 other buildings. Today it has 362 inhabitants.

== Education ==
A primary school, visited by around 80 to 90 children offers four years of education for children aged 5/6 to 9/10. It consists of two buildings that were built in the 1930s and 1960s.

A day care center, the Mosaik Kinderhaus, is visited by around 95 children.

== Population ==
- 1672: 140
- 1807: 222
- 1819: 216
- 1880: 1106
- 1939: 796
- 1950: 1053
- 1961: 912
- 2005: 1723
- 2012: 1811
