= Weißbach, Baden-Württemberg =

Weißbach
- Municipality
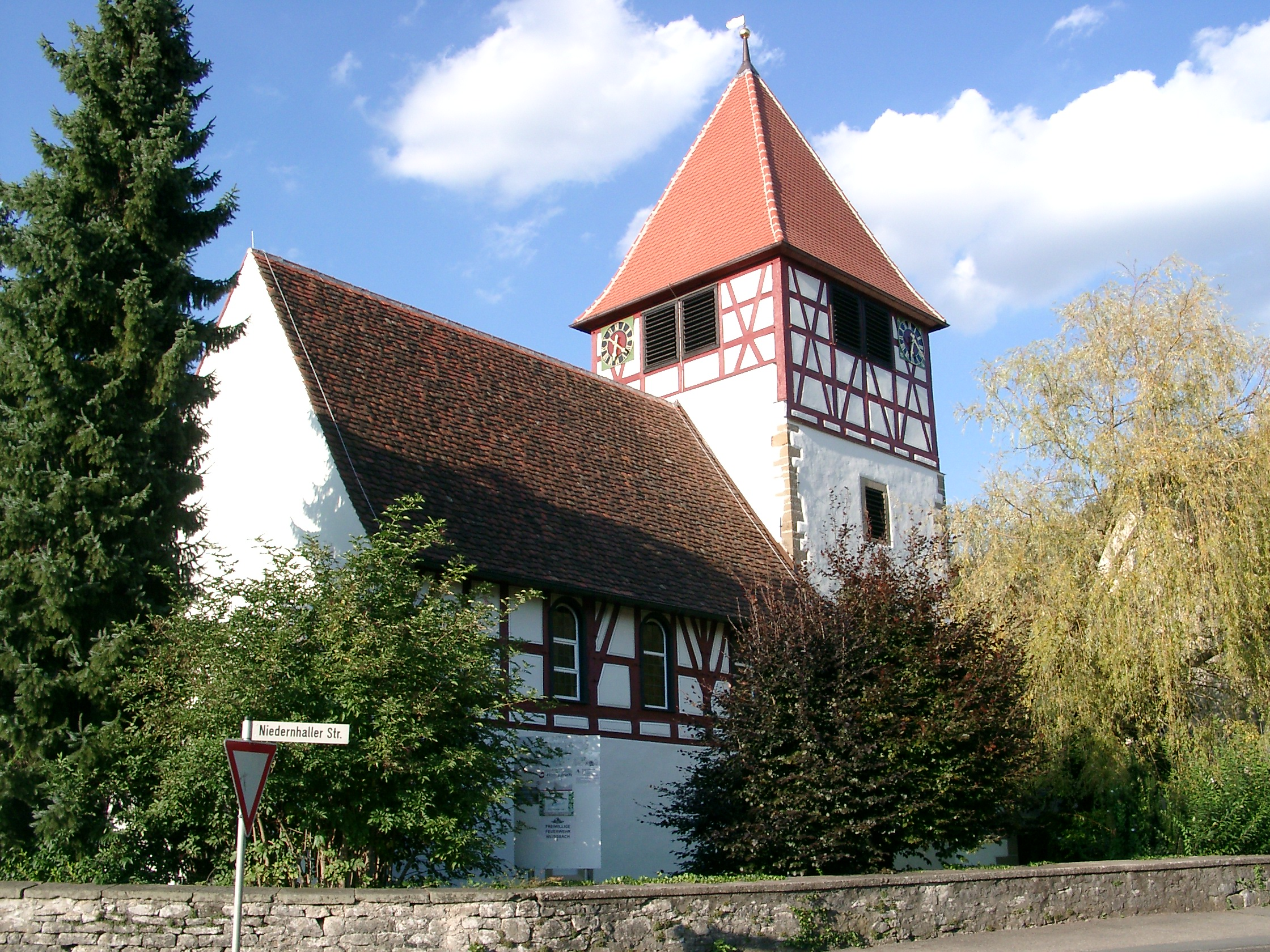

- Coat of arms

- Location of Weißbach within Hohenlohekreis district
- Interactive map of Weißbach
- Location within Germany Location within Baden-Württemberg
- Coordinates: 49°18′N 9°36′E
- Country: Germany
- State: Baden-Württemberg
- Admin. region: Stuttgart
- District: Hohenlohekreis
- Municipal assoc.: Mittleres Kochertal
- Subdivisions: 2

Government
  - Mayor (2021–29): Rainer Züfle

Area
  - Total: 12.77 km^{2} (4.93 sq mi)
- Elevation: 201 m (659 ft)

Population (2025-12-31)
  - Total: 2,070
  - Density: 162/km^{2} (420/sq mi)
- Time zone: UTC+01:00 (CET)
  - Summer (DST): UTC+02:00 (CEST)
- Postal codes: 74679
- Dialling codes: 07947
- Vehicle registration: KÜN, ÖHR
- Website: www.gemeinde-weissbach.de

Weißbach (German pronunciation: [ˈvaɪsbax]) is a town in the district of Hohenlohe in Baden-Württemberg in Germany.

== Geography ==
Weißbach is situated in the middle of the Kochertal valley where the Langenbach flows into the Kocher. Its parts stretch from 200 to 430 meters above sea level and it is 10 km west of its district town Künzelsau. It consists of the formerly independent villages Weißbach and Crispenhofen and the two hamlets Halberg and Guthof.

== Mayors ==
Since 1997: Rainer Züfle. He is the successor of Manfred Görke. Züfle was reelected in 2005, 2013 and 2021.

== Economy and infrastructure ==
=== Companies ===
- Konrad Hornschuch AG (Manufacturer of d-c-fix foils and of skai-artificial leather)

== Education ==
Weißbach has a primary school and two Kindergarten run by the Protestant church and one library.

== Sport ==
Weißbach has a gymnasium and in Crispenhofen there is a tennis court.
