= Mittleres Kochertal =

- Gemeindeverwaltungsverband
- Location of Mittleres Kochertal within Hohenlohe district
- Interactive map of Mittleres Kochertal
- Location within Germany Location within Baden-Württemberg
- Coordinates: 49°17′N 9°36′E
- Country: Germany
- State: Baden-Württemberg
- Admin. region: Stuttgart
- District: Hohenlohe
- Seat: Niedernhall
- Subdivisions: 3 municipalities

Area
  - Total: 68.57 km^{2} (26.48 sq mi)

Population (2025-12-31)
  - Total: 11,577
  - Density: 168.8/km^{2} (437.3/sq mi)
- Time zone: UTC+01:00 (CET)
  - Summer (DST): UTC+02:00 (CEST)
- Website: www.gvv-mittleres-kochertal.de

Mittleres Kochertal is a Gemeindeverwaltungsverband in the district of Hohenlohe in Baden-Württemberg, Germany. The seat of the Gemeindeverwaltungsverband is in Niedernhall.

The Gemeindeverwaltungsverband Mittleres Kochertal consists of the following municipalities:

1. Forchtenberg
2. Niedernhall
3. Weißbach
