= Schöntal =

German municipality

- Municipality
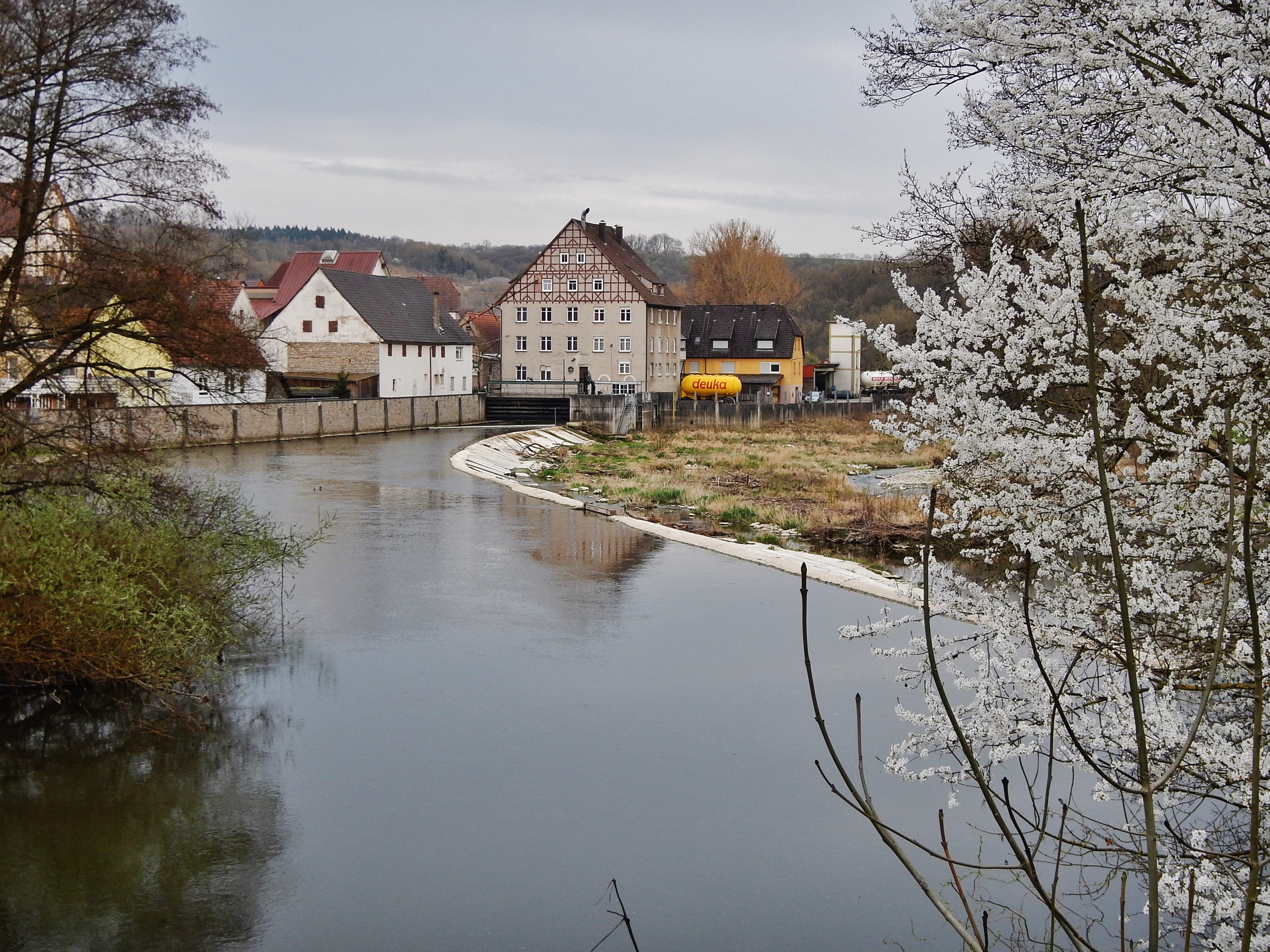
- The Jagst flowing through Schöntal

- Coat of arms

- Location of Schöntal within Hohenlohekreis district
- Interactive map of Schöntal
- Location within Germany Location within Baden-Württemberg
- Coordinates: 49°20′N 9°30′E
- Country: Germany
- State: Baden-Württemberg
- Admin. region: Stuttgart
- District: Hohenlohekreis

Area
  - Total: 81.67 km^{2} (31.53 sq mi)
- Elevation: 209 m (686 ft)

Population (2025-12-31)
  - Total: 5,599
  - Density: 68.56/km^{2} (177.6/sq mi)
- Time zone: UTC+01:00 (CET)
  - Summer (DST): UTC+02:00 (CEST)
- Postal codes: 74214
- Dialling codes: 07943
- Vehicle registration: KÜN, ÖHR
- Website: www.schoental.de

Schöntal (German pronunciation: [ˈʃøːntaːl]) is a municipality in the district of Hohenlohe in Baden-Württemberg, Germany. It is principally known as the location of Schöntal Abbey.

== Districts ==
The municipality consists of the following districts.

- Aschhausen
- Berlichingen
- Bieringen
- Schöntal Abbey
- Marlach
- Oberkessach
- Sindeldorf
- Westernhausen
- Winzenhofen

== History ==
Following the dissolution of Schöntal Abbey in 1802, its constituent towns were governed by the Kingdom of Württemberg as they had existed under the monastery. In 1810–11, this district was dissolved and its area given to the Öhringen, Neckarsulm, and Künzelsau districts. In 1938, these were all given to the Künzelsau district of the Free People's State of Württemberg. With the 1973 Baden-Württemberg district reform, Schöntal and its old Ortsteile have been assigned to the Hohenlohe district. The Bundesautobahn 81, running through Schöntal, began operation in 1974.

== Geography ==
The municipality (Gemeinde) of Schöntal comprises 8,165 hectares (20,180 acres) of the Hohenlohe district, within the state of Baden-Württemberg and the Federal Republic of Germany. Schöntal is physically located on the Kocher-Jagst plain and Kessach plateau. It is bisected by the Jagst river, which also marks the lowest elevation in the municipality at 199.29 meters (653.8 ft) above sea level NN. The highest elevation, 399.51 meters (1,310.7 ft), is found in the east of the municipal area.

== Coat of arms ==
The municipal coat of arms for Schöntal displays an armored fist in silver and a crosier in gold crossed diagonally over a green field but behind the Zisterzienserbalken, a checkerboard-pattern red-and-white bar associated with the Cistercian Order. This pattern was issued by the Hohenlohe district government on 19 September 1978, but evolved from renditions of a pattern in 1972 that omitted the armored hand, a reference to Götz von Berlichingen, who is buried in Schöntal. The crosier and the bar references the Cistercians, whose iconography, most prominently Schöntal Abbey's church, had been used to identify Schöntal in postage stamps in the past.
