= Neusaß =

Hamlet in Baden-Württemberg, Germany

Coordinates: 49°37′N 9°21′E

Neusaß is a small hamlet in Baden-Württemberg, Germany, near Schöntal Abbey.
