= Krautheim (Gemeindeverwaltungsverband) =

- Gemeindeverwaltungsverband
- Location of Krautheim within Hohenlohe district
- Interactive map of Krautheim
- Location within Germany Location within Baden-Württemberg
- Coordinates: 49°23′N 9°42′E
- Country: Germany
- State: Baden-Württemberg
- Admin. region: Stuttgart
- District: Hohenlohe
- Seat: Krautheim
- Subdivisions: 3 municipalities

Area
  - Total: 165.34 km^{2} (63.84 sq mi)

Population (2025-12-31)
  - Total: 10,682
  - Density: 64.606/km^{2} (167.33/sq mi)
- Time zone: UTC+01:00 (CET)
  - Summer (DST): UTC+02:00 (CEST)

Hohenloher Ebene is a Gemeindeverwaltungsverband in the district of Hohenlohe in Baden-Württemberg, Germany. The seat of the Gemeindeverwaltungsverband is in Krautheim.

The Gemeindeverwaltungsverband Krautheim consists of the following municipalities:

1. Dörzbach
2. Krautheim
3. Mulfingen
