= Niedernhall =

- Town
- Coat of arms

- Location of Niedernhall within Hohenlohekreis district
- Interactive map of Niedernhall
- Location within Germany Location within Baden-Württemberg
- Coordinates: 49°18′N 9°37′E
- Country: Germany
- State: Baden-Württemberg
- Admin. region: Stuttgart
- District: Hohenlohekreis
- Municipal assoc.: Mittleres Kochertal

Government
  - Mayor (2022–30): Achim Beck

Area
  - Total: 17.71 km^{2} (6.84 sq mi)
- Elevation: 202 m (663 ft)

Population (2025-12-31)
  - Total: 4,132
  - Density: 233.3/km^{2} (604.3/sq mi)
- Time zone: UTC+01:00 (CET)
  - Summer (DST): UTC+02:00 (CEST)
- Postal codes: 74676
- Dialling codes: 07940
- Vehicle registration: KÜN, ÖHR
- Website: www.niedernhall.de

Niedernhall (German: [ˈniːdɐnˌhal]) is a town in the Hohenlohe district, in Baden-Württemberg, Germany. It is situated on the river Kocher, 6 km west of Künzelsau, and 33 km northeast of Heilbronn.

== History ==
As "Inferiori Halle", Niedernhall was first documented in the 1037 Öhringen Foundation Letter, a letter addressed to the mother of King Konrad II, Adelaide of Metz. For a long time, Niedernhall was under the administration of the noble family of Hohenlohe. In 1356, under King Karl IV, the city was granted city rights. The city wall, with linked fortifications was finished in 1363, around 700 meters of which still exist.

The Laurentius church was built in the beginning of the 13th century. The town hall was finished in 1477.

The village was connected to the rail network in 1924, but it took several more years for the industrial revolution to take place in Niedernhall. After the Second World War, the population quickly grew from 1157 to around 4000.

=== Mayors after 1945 ===
	Term of office from	to	Note
Brändlein	1945	1946	appointed by military government
Friedrich Fahrbach	1946	1948	elected by local council
Walter Kaiser	1948	1951	
Wilhelm Balbach	1951	1993	
Emil G. Kalmbach	1993	2014	
Achim Beck	2014	today	

=== Coat of arms ===
The coat of arms show Saint Lawrence, after whom the main church of Niedernhall is named. A martyr, he is honored in many old citys' coat of arms.

== Economy ==
About 2.300 people in 100 companies work in Niedernhall. The primary industries are Electronics, wood, metal and plastics processing.

== Gallery ==
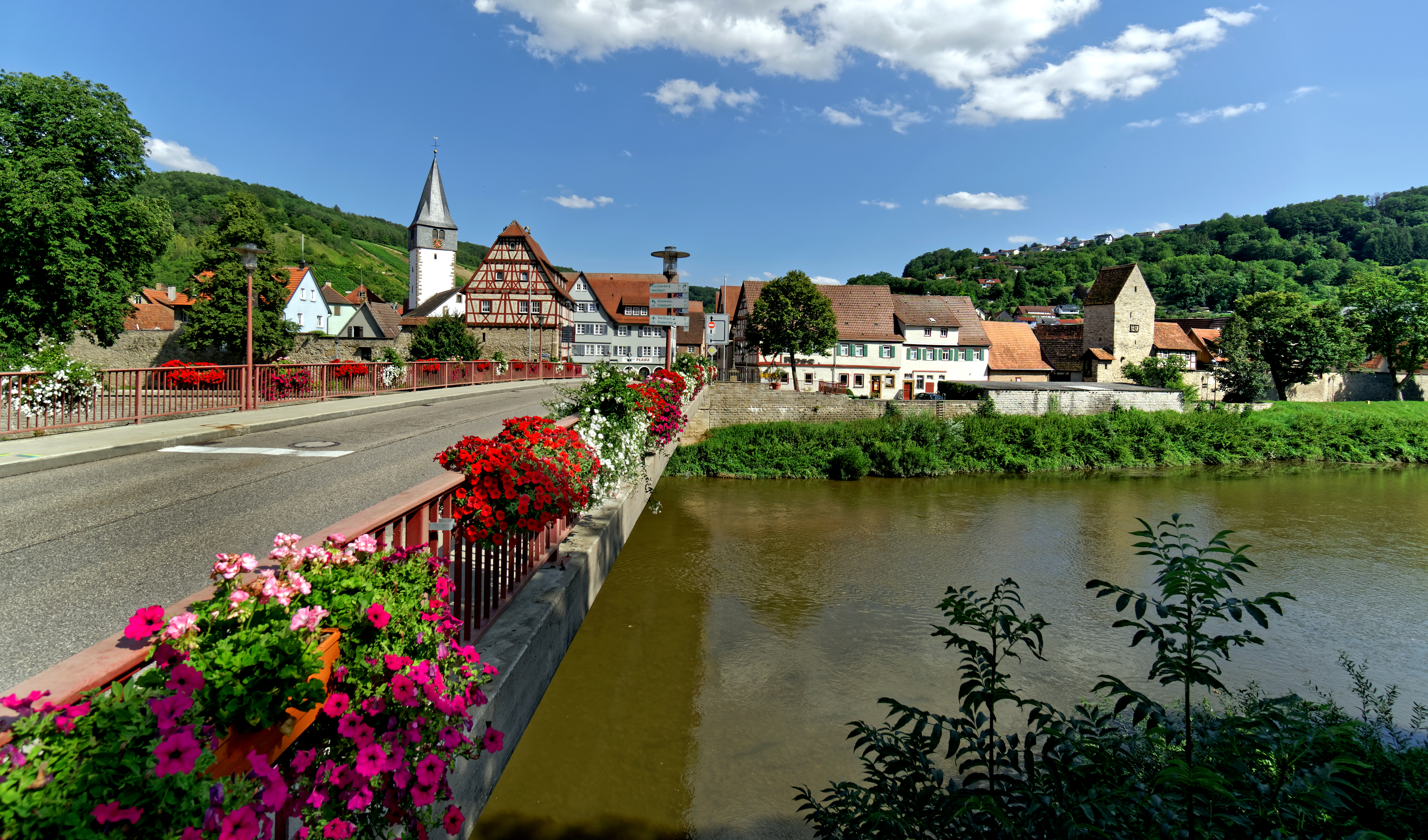

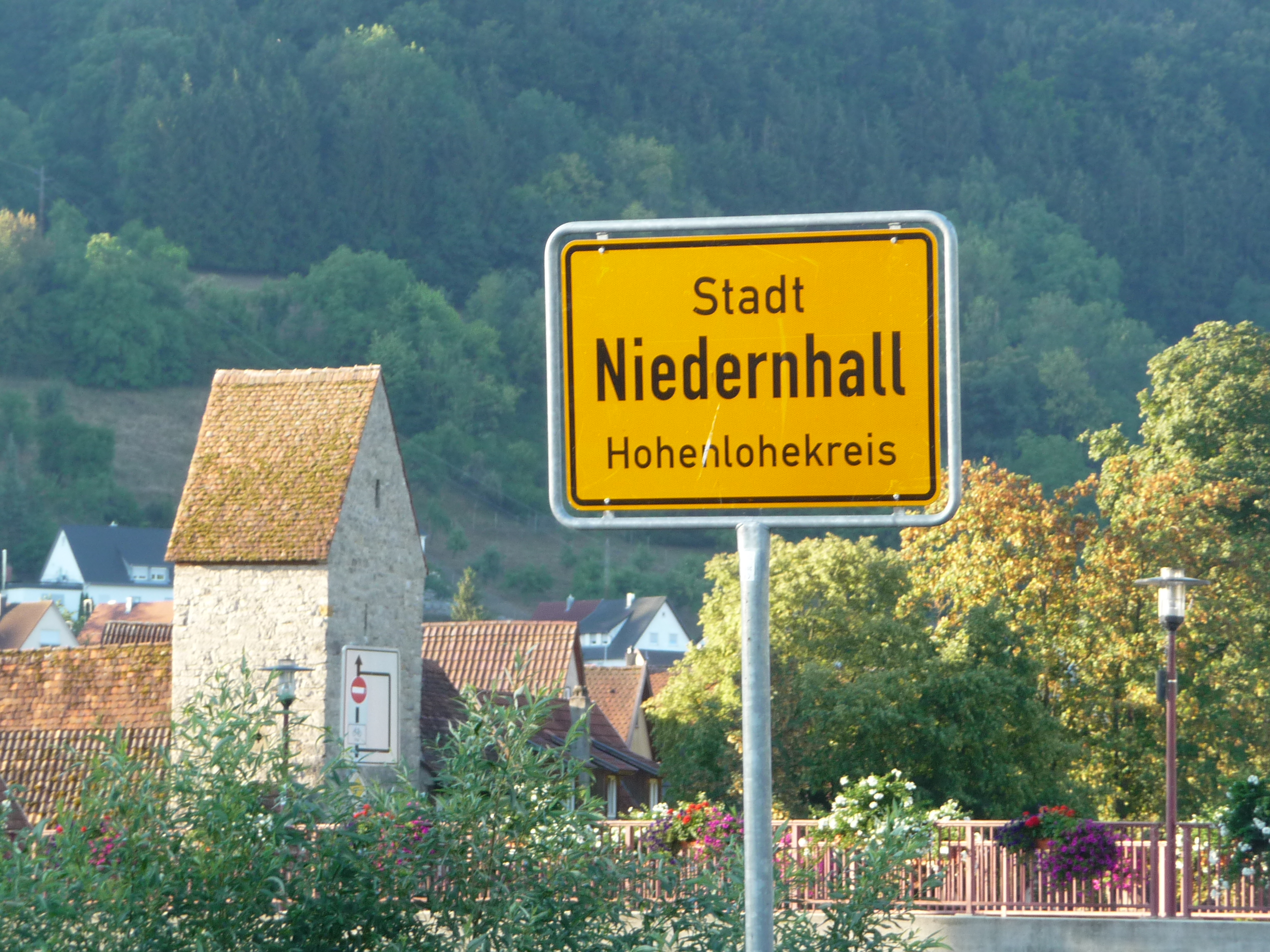

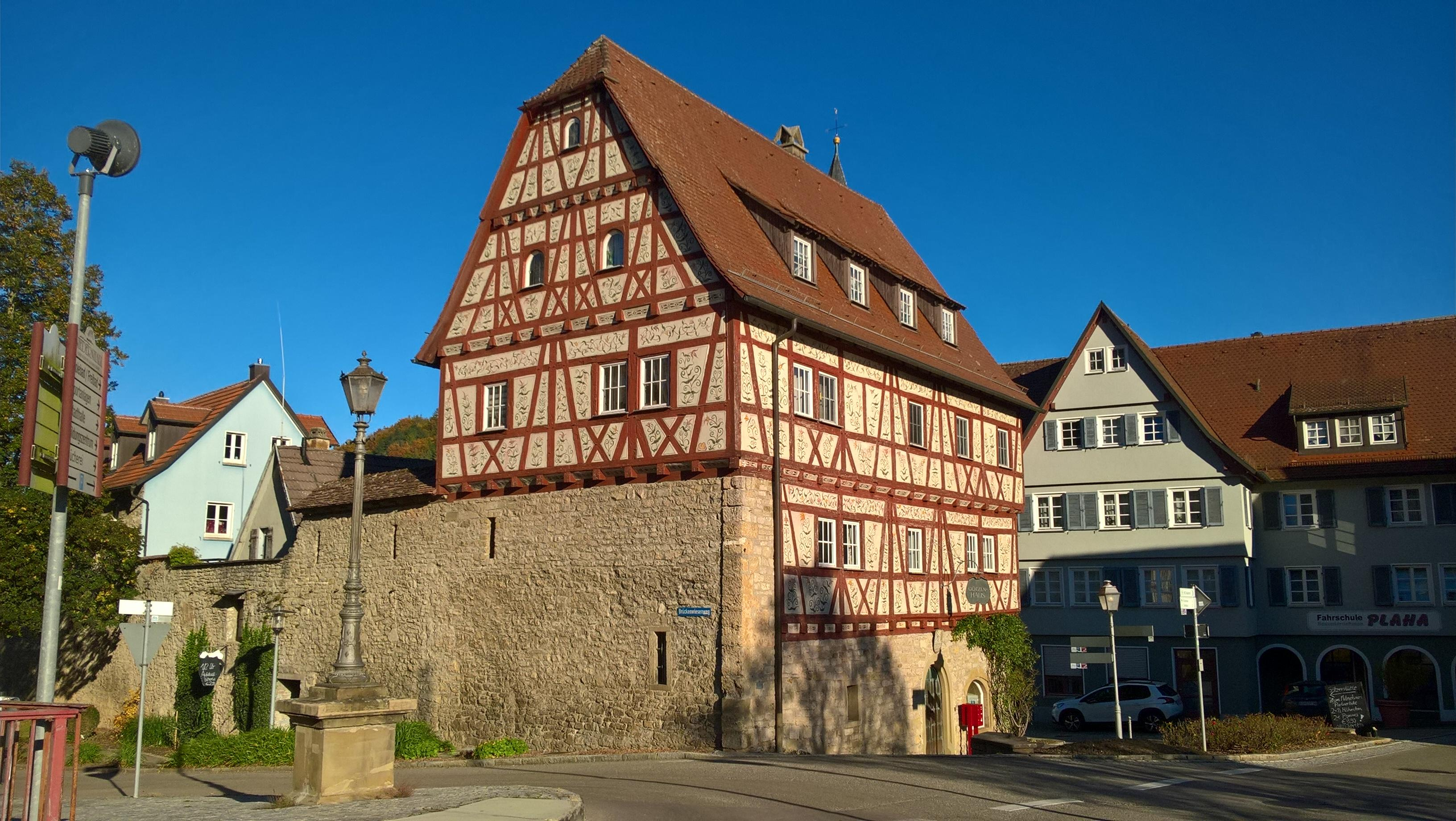

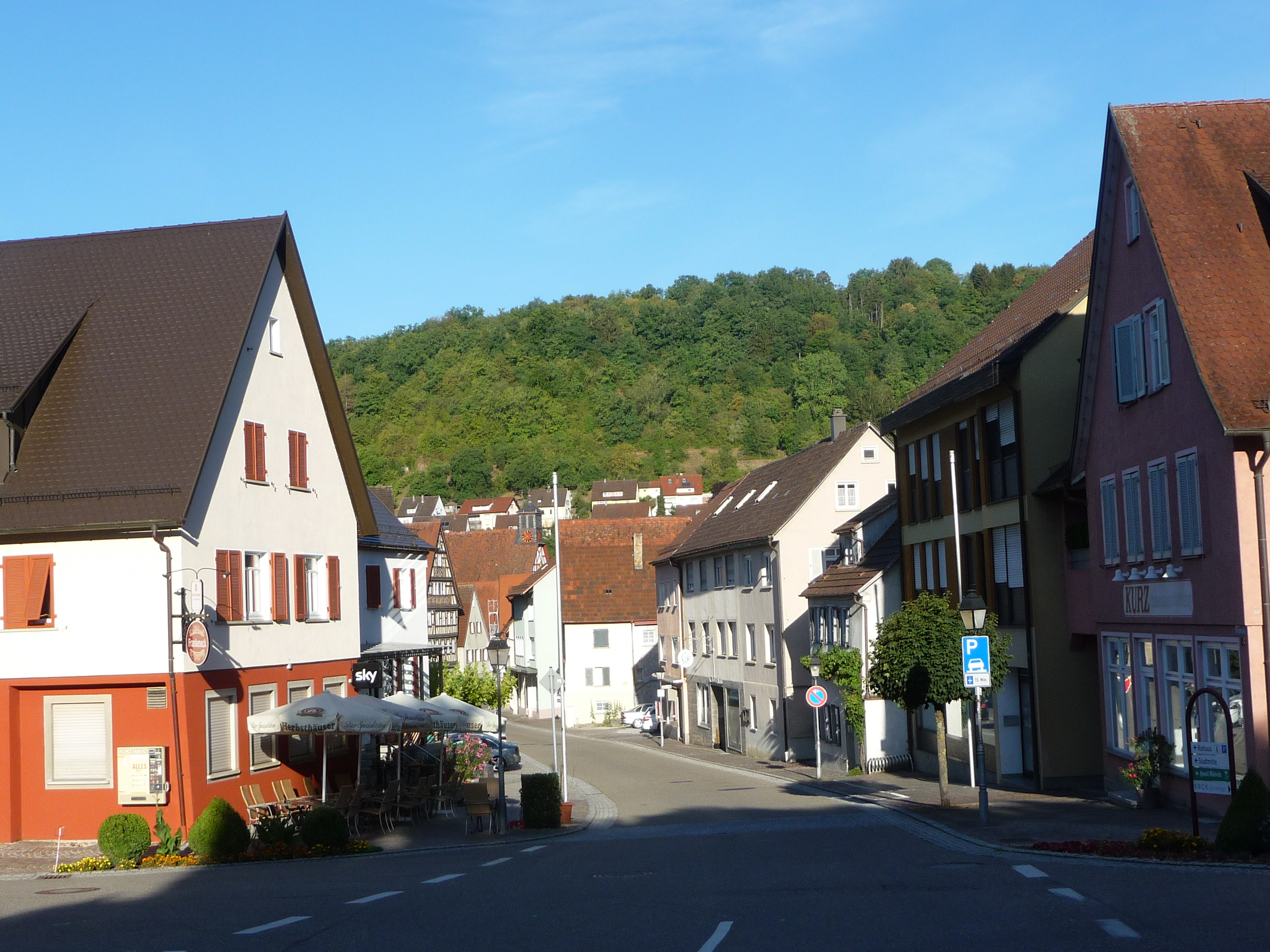

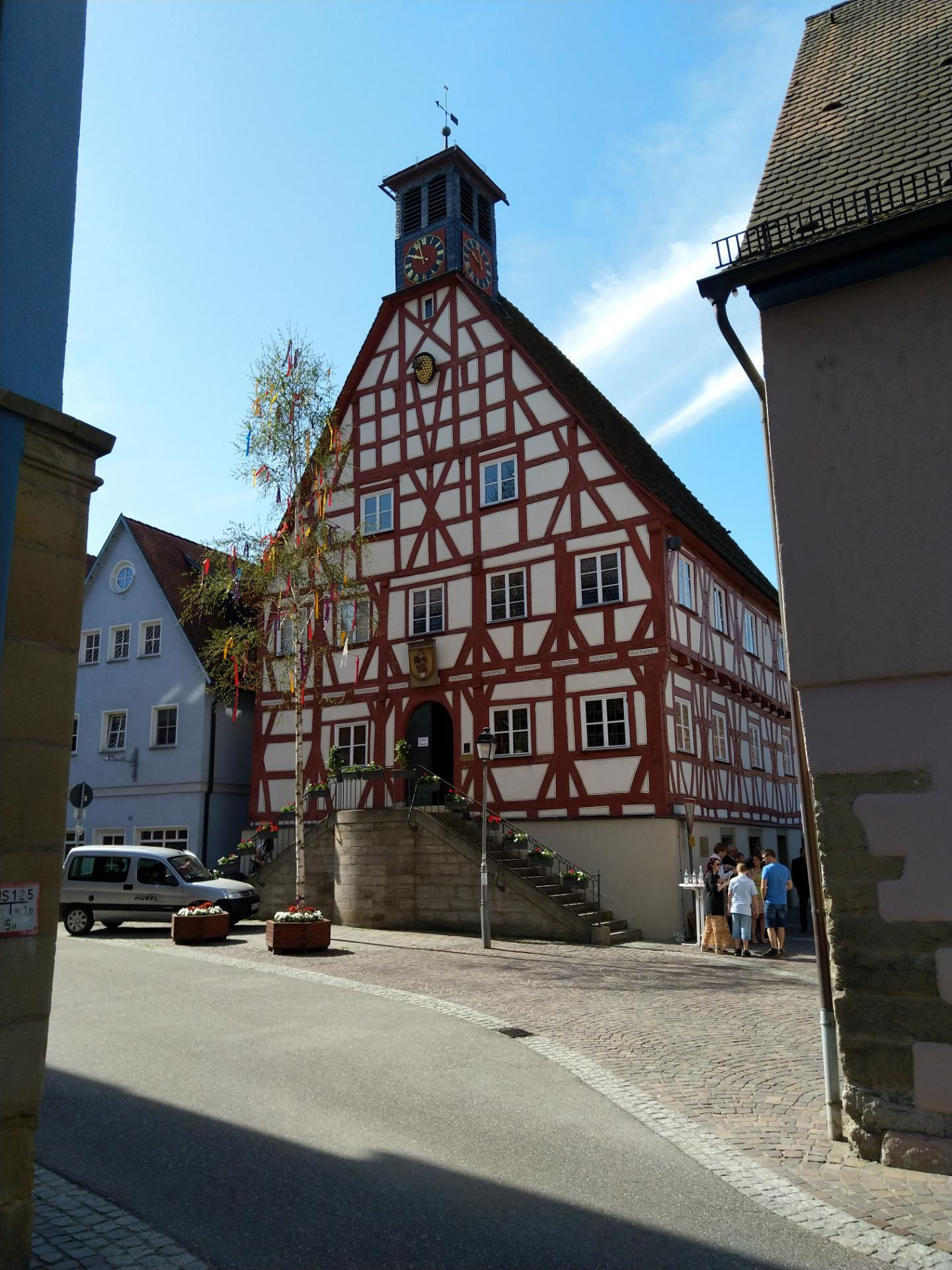

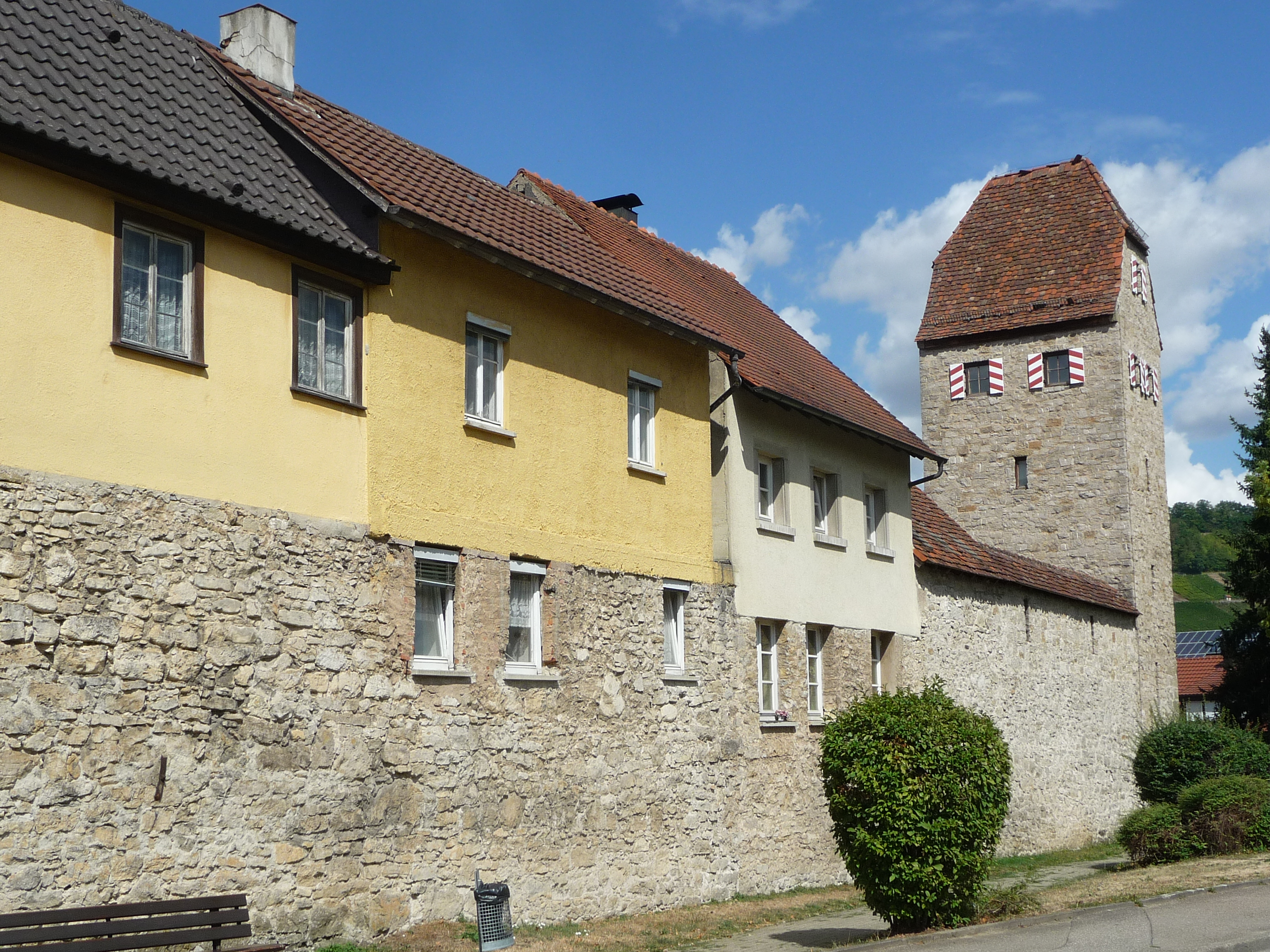

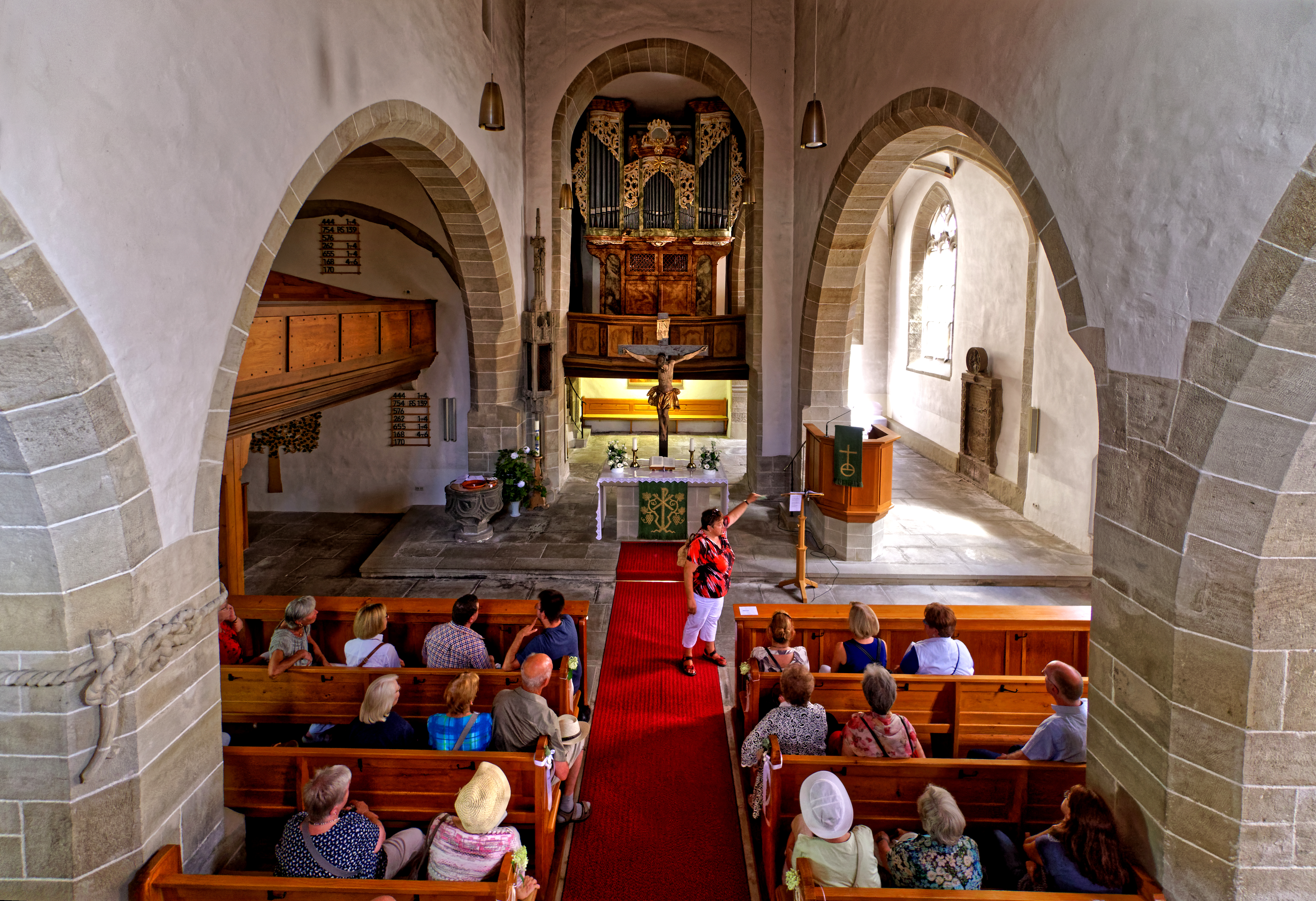
