= Bretzfeld =

- Municipality
- Coat of arms

- Location of Bretzfeld within Hohenlohekreis district
- Interactive map of Bretzfeld
- Location within Germany Location within Baden-Württemberg
- Coordinates: 49°11′N 9°26′E
- Country: Germany
- State: Baden-Württemberg
- Admin. region: Stuttgart
- District: Hohenlohekreis
- Subdivisions: 12 Ortsteile

Government
  - Mayor (2023–31): Martin Piott

Area
  - Total: 64.68 km^{2} (24.97 sq mi)
- Elevation: 210 m (690 ft)

Population (2025-12-31)
  - Total: 12,624
  - Density: 195.2/km^{2} (505.5/sq mi)
- Time zone: UTC+01:00 (CET)
  - Summer (DST): UTC+02:00 (CEST)
- Postal codes: 74626
- Dialling codes: 07946, 07945
- Vehicle registration: KÜN, ÖHR
- Website: www.bretzfeld.de

Bretzfeld (German pronunciation: [ˈbʁɛt͡sˌfɛlt]) is a municipality in the Hohenlohe district, in Baden-Württemberg, Germany. It is located 17 km (11 mi) east of Heilbronn. There is an exit (Nr. 39) with the same name at the A6 motorway.

Today's Bretzfeld is a sort of collective municipality or merger as the following 11 villages (Ortsteile), that each have their own history and previously were independent, were incorporated into the original village of Bretzfeld throughout 1972 and 1975: Adolzfurt, Bitzfeld, Brettach, Dimbach, Geddelsbach, Rappach, Scheppach, Schwabbach, Siebeneich, Unterheimbach, and Waldbach.

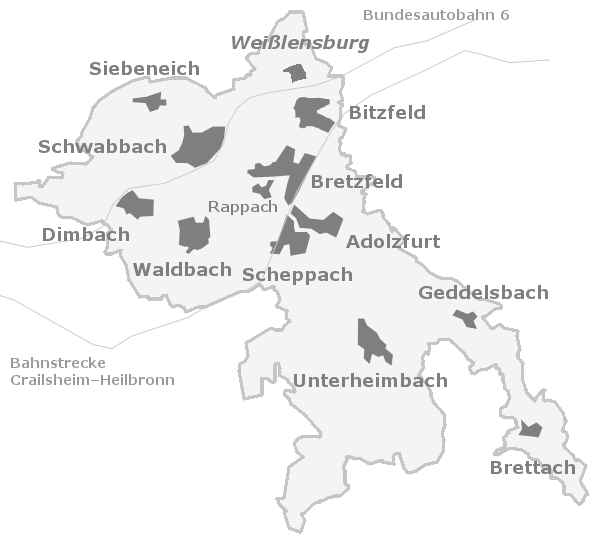

== History ==
Bretzfeld was first documented in the year 1037 as "Bretesfeld". During the years of the stem duchies, Bretzfeld was under control of the Duchy of Franconia. The territory was governed in two halves, one ruled by the canons' monastery of Öhringen and the other ruled by the Lords of Weinsberg, which exercised high justice. In 1423, Bretzfeld, along with other places formerly belonging to Weinsberg, came under the rule of the Electoral Palatinate. After the War of the Succession of Landshut, Bretzfeld came under the rule of Württemberg in 1504 and was incorporated into the Superior Office of Weinsberg.

In 1973, the districts of Heilbronn and Hohenlohe of today were established. All villages, except for Brettach, were included in the Hohenlohe district and were later merged into Bretzfeld in 1975, thus losing their status as completely independent municipalities. The exception Brettach was part of the Heilbronn district until 1977 but became part of the Heilbronn district when it was - for histocultural connections - also incorporated into Bretzfeld.

=== Adolzfurt ===
Historical population
Year	Pop.	±%
1861	432	—
1987	203	−53.0%
31.12.1998	189	−6.9%
30.06.2024	176	−6.9%

Adolzfurt was first historically mentioned in 1327 as "Adelhardtsfurth". The name probably comes from the male name "Adelhard". In the 13th century it was under the rule of Weinsberg until it was given to the Princes of Hohenlohe in 1336. In the same year, it was granted full city rights by Louis IV, Holy Roman Emperor. However, it never attained great importance, and in a document from 1350 it is again referred to as a village. From 1806 to 1812 the village was administered by Neuenstein. In 1812, Adolzburg became part of the Oberamt of Öhringen, an administrative region of Württemberg, which later became the Öhringen district in 1938. Today it is the only village in Bretzfeld that has never been part of the Weinsberg Oberamt.

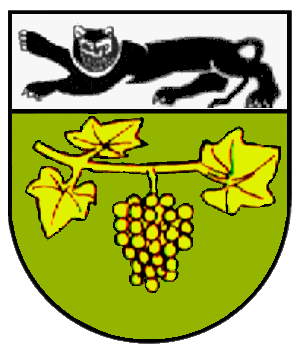

=== Bitzfeld (and Weißlensburg) ===

==== Weißlensburg ====
A legend and the name of the hamlet (the ending -burg) indicate that a castle once stood at its south-eastern end. Weißlensburg has been connected to Bitzfeld due to a law passed in 1837.

=== Brettach ===
Historical population
Year	Pop.	±%
1686	250 - 300	—
1806	506	—
1987	914	+80.6%
31.12.1998	998	+9.2%
30.09.2023	991	−0.7%

Originally documented as divided into Upper-Brettach and Lower-Brettach since 1376, the whole of Brettach is historically connected to the Maienfels Castle that is today in the eponymous village in Wüstenrot. Interestingly, the hamlets of Kreuzle und Busch, also part of Wüstenrot today, grew out of Brettach. Brettach was owned by the noble house of Weinsberg until they sold it to the Electoral Palatinate in 1423. Under Napoleon, the village became part of Württemberg in 1805. After that, Brettach was part of the following historical administrative divisions: Oberamt of Weinsberg (1809-1926), Oberamt of Öhringen (1926-1938), District of Öhringen (1938-1972), District of Heilbronn (1972-1977). It was incorporated into Bretzfeld on 1 January 1977, hence being the last village to "join" Bretzfeld.

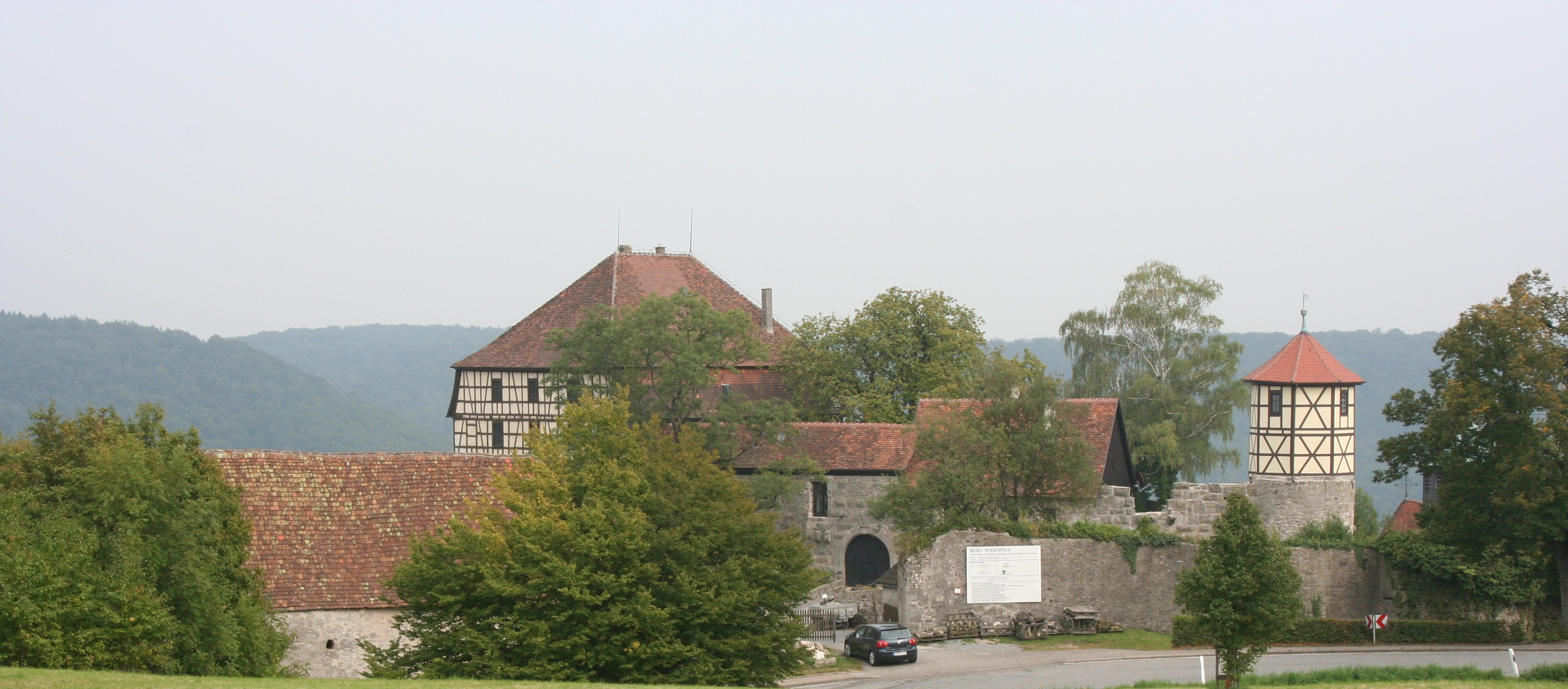
The Maienfels Castle

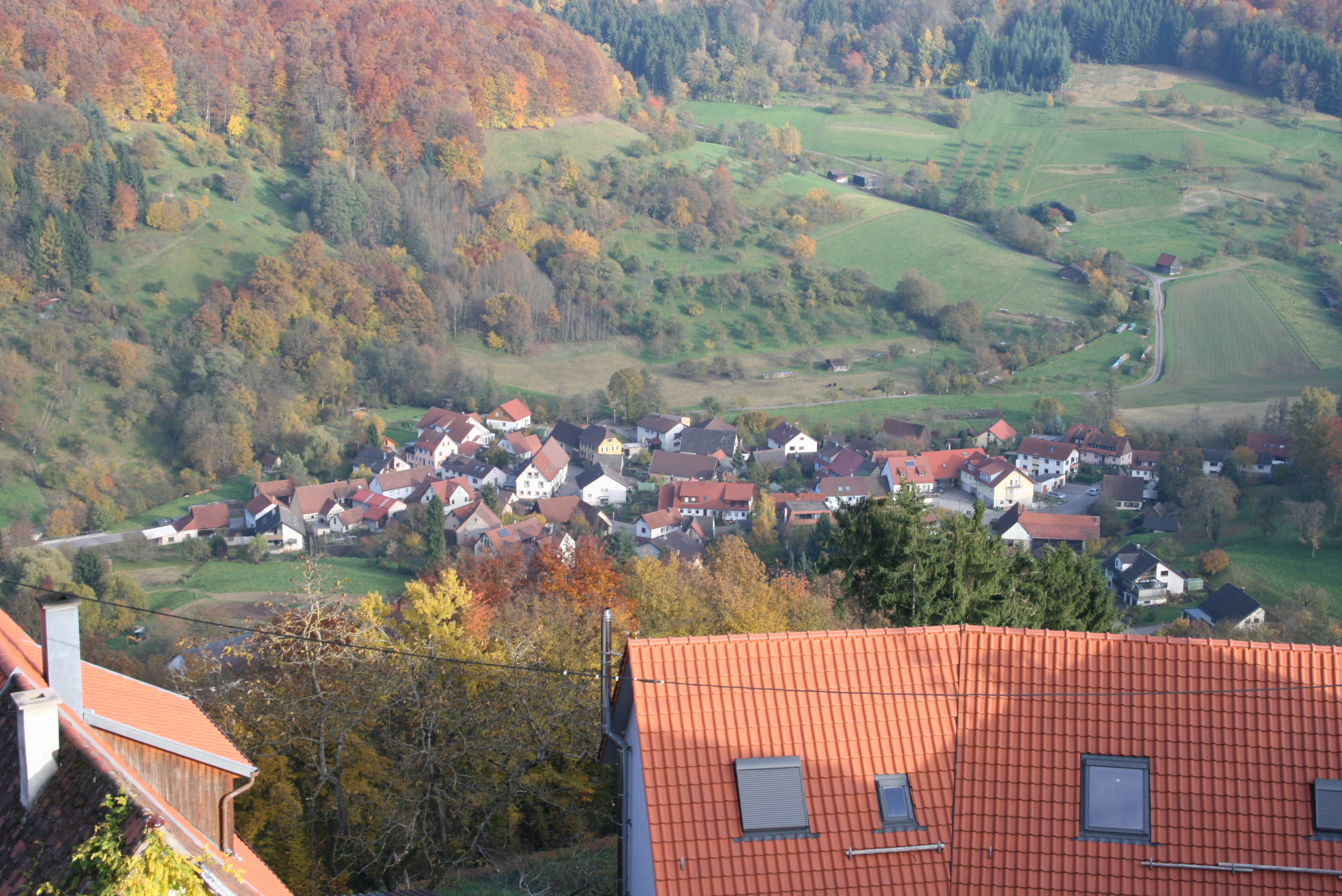
Brettach, as seen from the castle

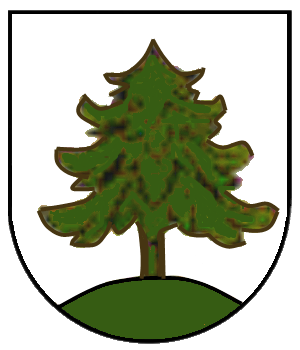

=== Dimbach ===
Historical population
Year	Pop.	±%
1624	250	—
1798	337	+34.8%
1808	391	+16.0%
1987	611	+56.3%
31.12.1998	823	+34.7%
30.09.2023	887	+7.8%

Dimbach was first mentioned in 1289 as "Tindebach". It was under the rule of Weinsberg until 1311. It was then under the administration of Lichtenstern Monastery until Würtemmberg took over the region shortly after the Reformation. The church in Dimbach was also built around this time.

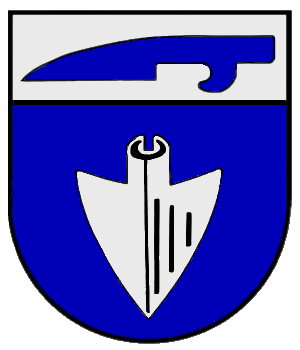

=== Gedelsbach ===
Historical population
Year	Pop.	±%
1680	150	—
1806	232	+54.7%
1987	194	−16.4%
31.12.1998	209	+7.7%
30.06.2024	280	+34.0%

First documented as Geydelsbach in 1337, it is uncertain whether the village belonged to the manor of either Heimberg or Maienfels. In the 15th century, the hamlet was owned by the Berlers, a family of Patricians. Heinrich Berler sold it to the noblemen of Hohenlohe in 1482. It stayed in their possession until it was taken by Württemberg in 1806. It was later part of the following historical administrative divisions: Oberamt of Öhringen (1809–12), Oberamt of Weinsberg (1812–26), Oberamt of Öhringen (1938–92), District of Öhringen (1972-1975). Gedelsbach joined the Hohenlohe district and was incorporated into Bretzfeld in 1975, by un-incorporating from Maienfels. Viticulture in Gedelsbach is attested since 1573, although it suffered under the Grape Phylloxera and was temporarily completely abolished in the 1960s. Today, predominantly white wine is grown, and the Geddelsbacher Schneckenhof has attained regional significance.

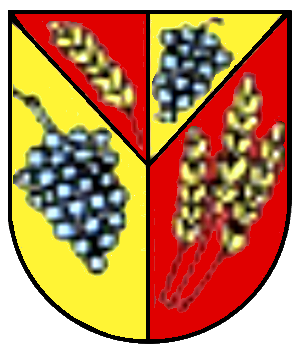

=== Rappach ===
Historical population
Year	Pop.	±%
1495	150	—
1769	263	+75.3%
1806	339	+28.9%
1961	385	+13.6%
1987	616	+60.0%
31.12.1998	1,357	+120.3%
30.06.2024	1,241	−8.5%

Rappach, first documented in 1215 as Rohbach, in 1253 as Rotbach and in 1277 as Rotpach, is known under its current form since the 16th century and is thought to have originated a lot earlier, in the ninth or tenth century. As most clearly recognizable in the 1253 version, the village was probably named after a red river or stream, as rot means red and Bach means River/Stream in German. The reason for the settlement might have been a castle that is said to have been located at the so-called Edelmannhof (lit. 'Nobleman's Court'), although no trace of the former has been found. Until 1450, Rappach is thought to have been under rule of the noblemen of Weinsberg, before it was taken by Electoral Palatinate and later by Württemberg in 1504.

It became part of the Oberamt Weinsberg in the Heilbronn district by 1806. After the abolition of that Oberamt, Rappach was in the Öhringen Oberamt, which was renamed to district of Öhringen in 1938. In a territorial reform in 1972, Rappach became part of the then newly created Hohenlohe district and was from then on administered collectively with Bretzfeld on a voluntary basis. The de-jure incorporation of Rappach happened in 1975.

The village underwent a major expansion at the beginning of the 1980s when the "Steinsfeld" (translatable to Rockfield) development area was established. Interestingly it was built were a former hamlet - a ghost town of the 16th century - Steinfurt (translatable to "Rockford" in english, like in Illinois) once stood.

The church of Rappach dates back to at least the 15th century, thus being one of the oldest in the region. It is dedicated to st. Jacob and st. John.

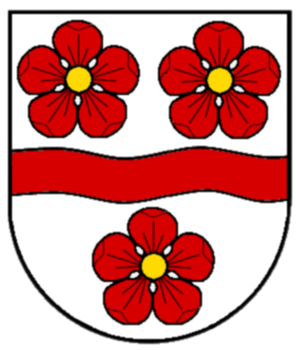

=== Scheppach ===
Historical population
Year	Pop.	±%
1495	120	—
1769	327	+172.5%
1806	339	+3.7%
1987	772	+127.7%
1998	1,036	+34.2%
30.06.2024	1,063	+2.6%

Scheppach is one of the oldest villages in Bretzfeld. "Schepach" was first mentioned in a document from 1257 but has a history going back to the 12th century. In its early history it was located roughly at the border of the spheres of influence of Löwenstein and Weinsberg. In 1407, the conflict was resolved as the village came under protection of Konrad of Weinsberg. In 1423, Scheppach was sold to Electoral Palatinate and later was taken by Württemberg.

When the Oberämter were created, Scheppach became part of the Weinsberg Oberamt and - after the latter was abolished - came under administration of the Oberamt (and after 1936 as district) of Öhringen which itself was abolished in a territorial reform in 1972. From then on, the village was part of the Hohenlohe district and became part of Bretzfeld in 1975.

Viticulture is confirmed to take place in Scheppach since at least 1528 but has declinced since then. In the 1950's the activity completely ended.

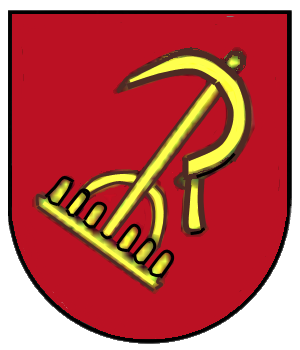

=== Schwabbach ===
The village of Schabbach is at least a thousand years old as it was first historically mentioned in document of 1037 as "Suabbach". It belonged to the noblemen of Weinsberg until it was sold to the electoral palatinate in 1446 and was taken by Württemberg in 1504.

=== Siebeneich ===
Historical population
Year	Pop.	±%
1624	31	—
1769	135	+335.5%
1810	203	+50.4%
31.12.1998	186	−8.4%
30.06.2024	254	+36.6%

Siebeneich was first historically documented in 1335. Throughout history, its spelling changed many times as - for example - by 1505 it was spelled "Sybenaych". The village had formed from a few individual farms that had grown together over time.

It became an independent municipality by 1836, previously being under administration of Schwabbach. In the 15th century it belonged to the noblemen of Weinsberg until it was sold to Electoral Palatinate in 1450. As a result of the War of the Succession of Landshut in 1504 the village came under authority of Württemberg. There it was part of the Oberamt of Weinsberg in the district of Heilbronn from 1806. After the Weinsberg Oberamt was abolished in 1926, Siebeneich was placed into the Oberamt of Öhringen, which later became the Öhringen District. After a district reform in 1972, Siebeneich became part of the newly created Hohenlohe district of today where it was incorporated into Bretzfeld in 1975, effectively losing its full autonomy after roughly 130 years of independence.

Today's Siebeneich is characterised by modern agriculture. Speciality crops are grown there on a large scale. The "Siebeneicher Himmelreich", a major vineyard in the south of the village, is a tourist attraction and is a popular location for hikes.

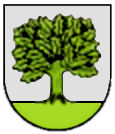

=== Unterheimbach ===
Unterheimbach, first mentioned in 1300 as Heinebach, was taken by Württemberg in the early 19th century. It was previously ruled by various princes and noblemen, most notably the Lords of Heimberg. The ruins of the Heimberg Castle (today often erroneously called the Hellmath Ruin) bear witness to them. Viticulture, as it is attested since at least 1537, still has major regional cultural significance.

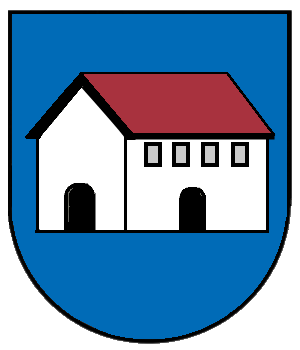

=== Waldbach ===
Historical population
Year	Pop.	±%
1798	526	—
1809	607	+15.4%
1987	1,118	+84.2%
31.12.1998	1,445	+29.2%
30.06.2024	1,670	+15.6%

Waltbach, was first documented in 1264 and belonged to the Grafschaft of Löwenstein. After it was owned by the House of Habsburg for a short period of time, it was traded with the House of Hohenlohe for the village of Gerabronn in 1387. After it was taken by Württemberg, it was, like Dimberg, under administration of the Liechtenstern Monastery, after the reformation in 1534. It was later part of the following historical administrative divisions: District of Heilbronn (1806/7), Oberamt of Weinsberg (1807-?), Oberamt of Öhringen (?-1936), District of Öhringen (1938-1972). It was moved to the Hohenlohe District in 1972, where it was incorporated into Bretzfeld two years later. The village church is of cultural significance and local viticulture is attested since 1438

Waldbach is, after the main village Bretzfeld, the second biggest village of the Bretzfeld municipality.

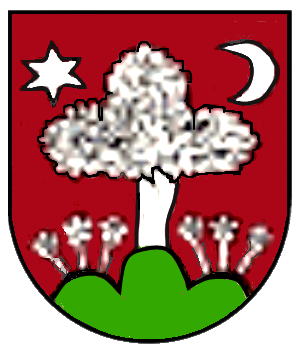

== Twin towns ==
- Hungary: Budaörs (since 1989)
- Germany: Pretzfeld, (since 1978, because of the similar name and a Mail-Delivery accident therefore)
