= Krautheim =

- Town
- Coat of arms

- Location of Krautheim within Hohenlohekreis district
- Interactive map of Krautheim
- Location within Germany Location within Baden-Württemberg
- Coordinates: 49°23′N 9°38′E
- Country: Germany
- State: Baden-Württemberg
- Admin. region: Stuttgart
- District: Hohenlohekreis
- Municipal assoc.: Krautheim
- Subdivisions: 9

Government
  - Mayor (2023–31): Andreas Insam

Area
  - Total: 52.9 km^{2} (20.4 sq mi)
- Elevation: 298 m (978 ft)

Population (2025-12-31)
  - Total: 4,502
  - Density: 85.1/km^{2} (220/sq mi)
- Time zone: UTC+01:00 (CET)
  - Summer (DST): UTC+02:00 (CEST)
- Postal codes: 74238
- Dialling codes: 06294
- Vehicle registration: KÜN, ÖHR
- Website: www.krautheim.de

Krautheim (German pronunciation: [ˈkʁaʊthaɪm]; East Franconian: Graude) is a town in the Hohenlohe district of Baden-Württemberg, in south central Germany. It is situated on the river Jagst, 12 km (8 mi) northwest of Künzelsau, and 16 km (10 mi) southwest of Bad Mergentheim. The town lies in the border area between the Baden and Württemberg regions. Records from the year 1096 mention the area as "Crutheim", but the modern incorporation was approved during 1972–73.

== Geography ==
=== Geographical location ===
Krautheim is located at the northernmost point of the Jagst river, at elevation 210–420 metres (690–1,380 ft), in southern Germany. The Jagst river, in this area, has dug 130–150 m deep (430–490 ft) into the limestone terrain of the Hoheloher Ebene. Characteristic of Krautheim is the view of the same castle visible from afar, which offers a 17 m high and up to 2.70 m thick shield wall (55.8 ft × 8.9 ft), as an impressive sight. The massive castle keep, with its height of 30 metres (98 ft), gives a comprehensive view into the Jagst valley and the surrounding landscape.

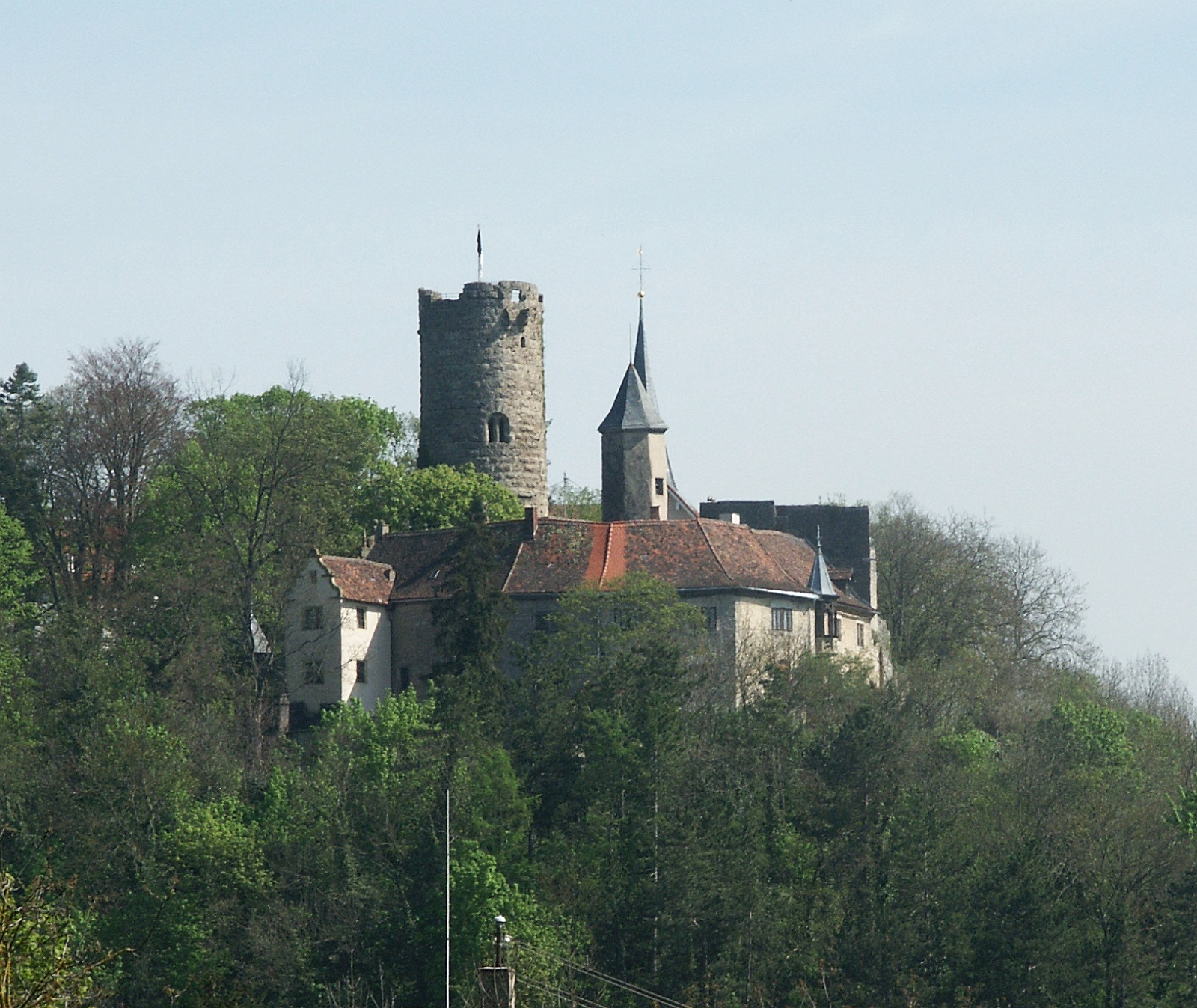
Krautheimer Castle

=== City outline ===
The current city of Krautheim is the result of administrative reform during 1972/1973. At the time, there was a merger of the formerly independent municipalities of Baden Krautheim, Gommersdorf, Horrenbach, Klepsau, Neunstetten, Oberndorf and the Württemberg-based communities of Altkrautheim, Ober- und Unterginsbach together. The area was named as the city of Krautheim. The towns have a range between about 60 and 700 inhabitants, and Krautheim itself as the central town has about 2,000 inhabitants.

Among the former municipalities, Altkrautheim, Gommersdorf, Horrenbach, Klepsau, Krautheim, Oberginsbach and Unterginsbach only belong the localities of the same name. The former municipality Neunstetten includes the village Neunstetten und the subdivisions Ölmühle und Untere Mühle. The former municipality Oberndorf includes the village of Oberndorf and the subdivisions of Knock (Kapellenberg) und Stockbrunnenwiesen.

Many sections have changed their names from the former villages. In the urban area of Krautheim are the municipalities of Stein, Windberg and Zimmerbach in the area of former Gommersdorf, Dacht in the area of the former Horrenbach, Nydelingen, Pichintal and Wellendorf in the area of Krautheim before the reform, Obererlenbach in the area of the former Neunstetten, Remenweiler in the area of the former Oberginsbach, and Mutzenbrunn in the area of the former community Oberndorf.

== History ==
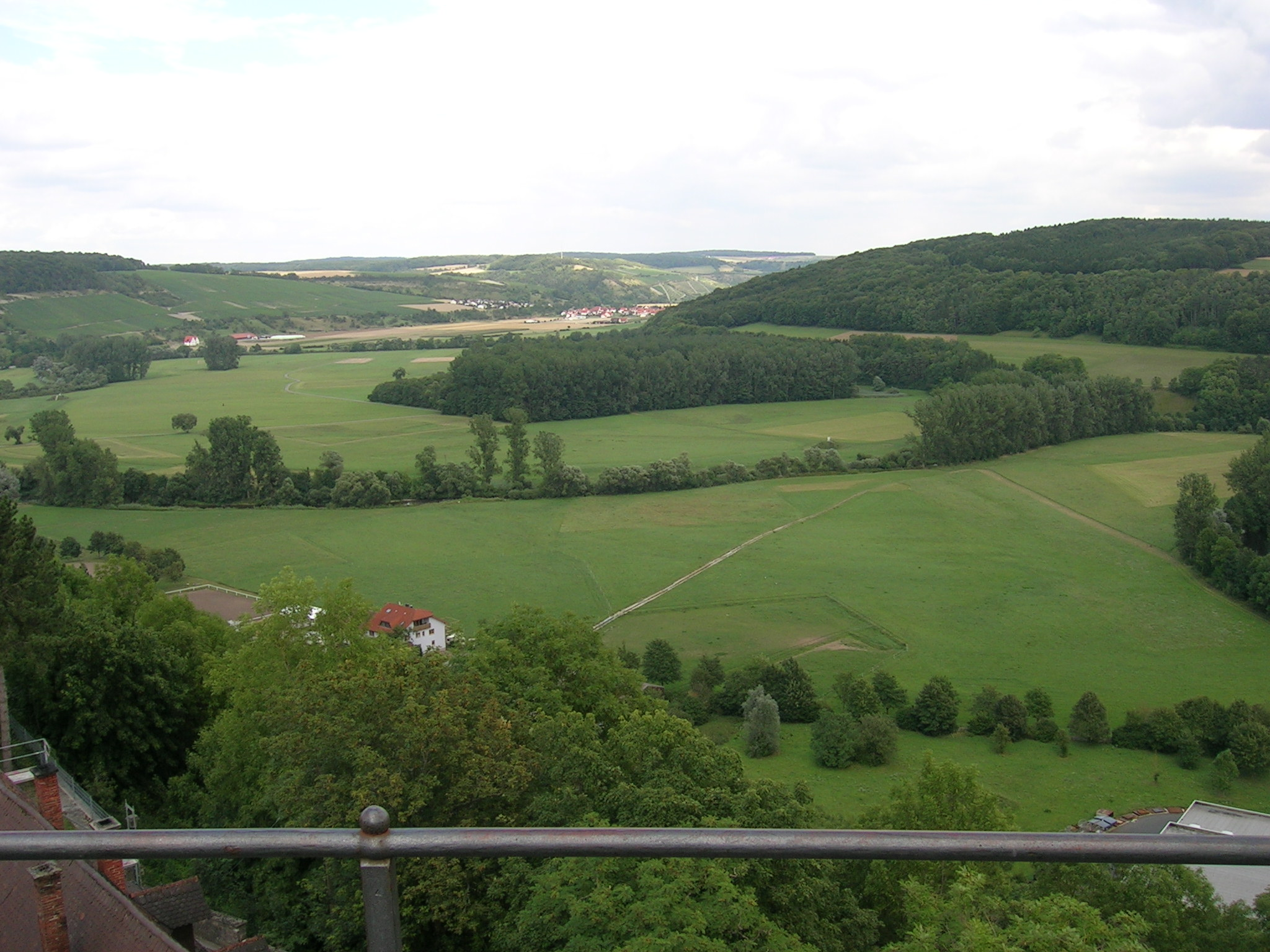
View from Castle Krautheim - Here is the Jagst river as border between Baden and Württemberg.

There are several significant events in the history of Krautheim.

- 1096: Krautheim (meaning today Altkrautheim) is first mentioned as Crutheim, which was founded by the Franks.
- 1213: The castle (in today's capital Krautheim) is of Wolfrad I of Krautheim built on the rocky spur.
- 1240 - 1242: The Hohenstaufen imperial regalia (imperial crown, scepter and empire sword) are probably in the castle Krautheim custody.
- 1306: Krautheim and Ballenberg jointly have city rights
- 1329: Krautheim was first mentioned as a town.
- 1399 onward: Krautheim under Kurmainzer hegemony or domination.
- 1516: Götz von Mainz Berlichingen calls the magistrate by Goethe's drama Götz von Berlichingen become immortal words "... but he'll tell him he can tell me ..." to.
- 1803: As compensation for the left-bank-area losses, the ancestral home Salm-Reifferscheidt-Bedburg replaced in the Imperial Diet-circuit the Principality herb home that was newly formed from formerly kurmainzischen and Würzburg's possessions and find city and the district administrator Krautheim included the monastery Schöntal, the Priory Gerlach's home and the office green field.
- 1806: The Act of Confederation, the Principality of Krautheim after only three years, is mediated existence. The Office Krautheim is split along the Jagst river into a northern Baden and a southern Wuerttemberg part; Krautheim comes to Baden, while Altkrautheim to Württemberg.

== Politics ==
=== Town council ===
The Kommunalwahl of 13 June 2004 consisted of the following seats, as percentages of the town council:

FWG	56.5%	+7.7	10 seats	±0
CDU	43.5%	-7.7	8 seats	-2

=== Coat of arms and flag ===
Coat of arms

The blazon of the Krautheimer flag is: 12 horizontal stripes of black and silver, split from a red box above the left transept, containing the silver 6-spoked wheel of Mainz. The city flag is black and white.

The oldest known seal of Krautheim from 1473 shows only the Mainzer wheel. After Krautheim in 1806 became part of Baden, the city seal was first a clover leaf, from 1898, but again the Mainzer wheel in 1950, and the city with the Wheel of Mainz resulted in a red and green split shield. The current twelve stripes, of black and silver shield, go back to the arms of the former local nobility, and from them are the flag colors derived. The current coat of arms, which connects the wheel of Mainz, with the arms of the local nobility, was approved for the city on 5 November 1955, by the Baden-Württemberg Ministry of the Interior, who awarded the flag on 14 October 1971.

== Economy and infrastructure ==
=== Traffic ===
Until 1988, Krautheim was connected with the Jagsttal railway web (Möckmühl - Dörzbach), to the national rail network. Today the nearest railway stations are located in Möckmühl, Schwäbisch Hall Hessental, Bad Mergentheim and Osterburken. The nearest motorway is the A81 (exit Osterburken). The next road is the B19, which runs through the neighboring town of Dörzbach.

=== Established companies ===
The near-Künzelsau-based Würth Group is also of great importance. In Krautheim are also the company Wöhrle (metal goods factory) and Dometic Seitz (supplier of caravan and mobile home owner). The institutions are the Federal Association of Self-Help Association, the largest employers of the physically disabled.

=== Museums ===
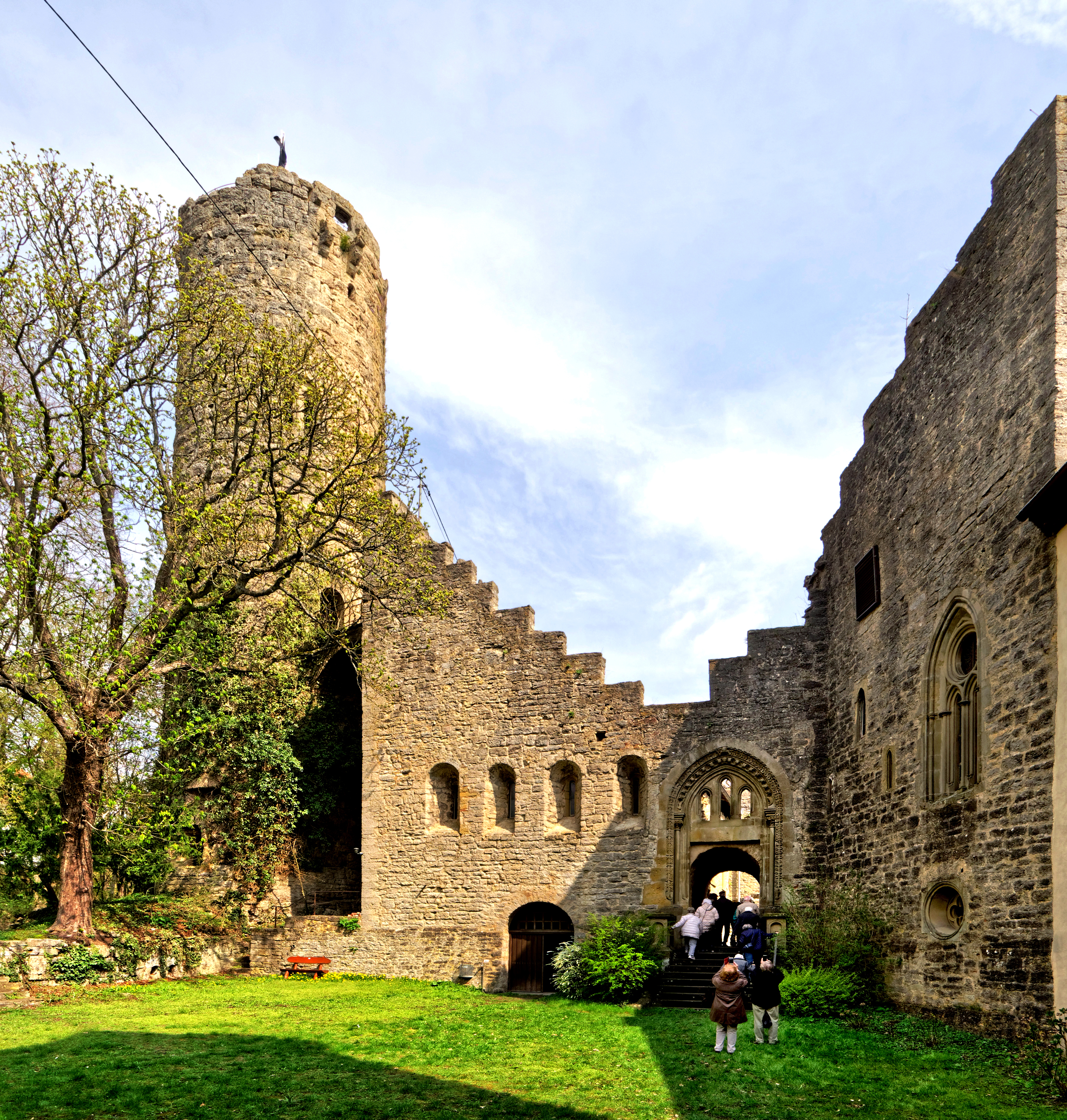
Krautheimer Castle

Castle home & St. John's Museum.
An insight into the history of St John, the castle on the hill next to the town hall of the city, the St. John Museum.

Castle Museum
In the castle museum, people can learn about the history of the Krautheim Castle. Both the Castle and St. John's Museum are open from May to September on weekends and holidays. Outside of opening times, interested parties can register with the Government.

=== Natural monuments ===
The Krautheimer Kuharsch was created by a source, that has very hard water, and formed by sintering a channel whose bizarre form of the name of this natural phenomenon reflects vividly. The Krautheimer Kuharsch is a station on the "Path of Silence" in and around Dörzbach and is under protection. It is located about 600 metres (2,000 ft) behind the exit of Krautheim towards Klepsau at the 1025th L.

=== Sports ===
In the Krautheim section, the sports include a football club (TSV Krautheim), tennis (TSC Krautheim) and a volleyball club (ASC Krautheim). In Gommersdorf, the football club is VfR Gommersdorf (National League Odenwald) resident.
