= Dörzbach =

- Municipality
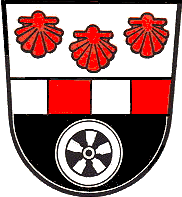
- Coat of arms

- Location of Dörzbach within Hohenlohekreis district
- Interactive map of Dörzbach
- Location within Germany Location within Baden-Württemberg
- Coordinates: 49°23′N 9°42′E
- Country: Germany
- State: Baden-Württemberg
- Admin. region: Stuttgart
- District: Hohenlohekreis
- Municipal assoc.: Krautheim
- Subdivisions: 4

Government
  - Mayor (2022–30): Andy Kümmerle

Area
  - Total: 32.35 km^{2} (12.49 sq mi)
- Elevation: 242 m (794 ft)

Population (2025-12-31)
  - Total: 2,547
  - Density: 78.73/km^{2} (203.9/sq mi)
- Time zone: UTC+01:00 (CET)
  - Summer (DST): UTC+02:00 (CEST)
- Postal codes: 74677
- Dialling codes: 07937
- Vehicle registration: KÜN, ÖHR
- Website: doerzbach.de

Dörzbach (German pronunciation: [ˈdœʁt͡sˌbax]; East Franconian: Därzbach) is a municipality in the Jagst river valley in the Hohenlohe district of Baden-Württemberg, in south central Germany. It is also the site of 3 historic castles, the Chapel of St. Wendel (in a limestone hillside), and a stone bridge built in 1808–1810 for King Frederick I of Württemberg. Records for the Dörzbach area date to 1230, but the modern incorporation was approved during 1972–74.

== Geography of Dörzbach ==
Dörzbach is located in the Jagst river valley, at an elevation of 230–430 metres (750–1,410 ft), in southern Germany.

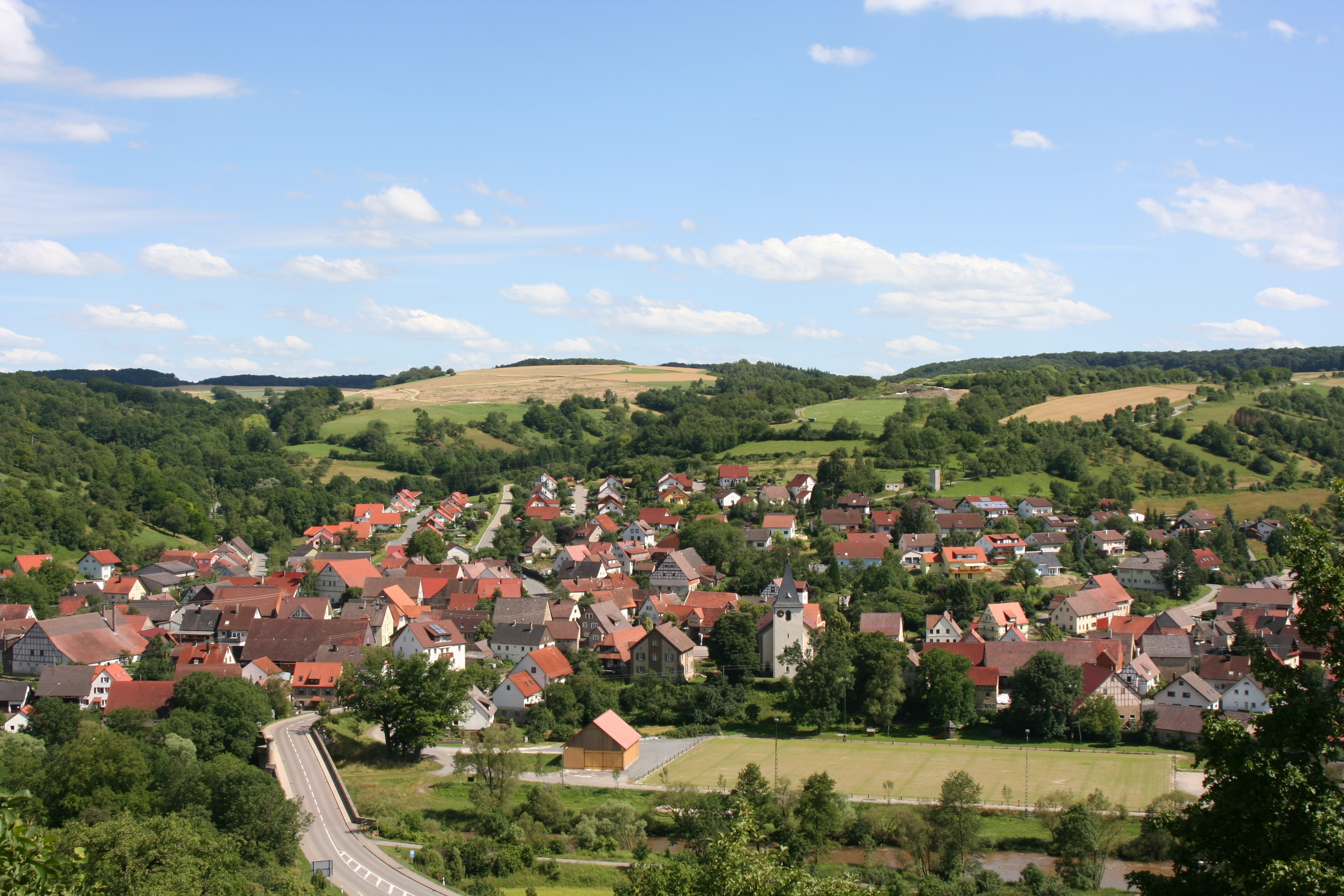
The Hohebach section of Dörzbach.

=== Communities ===
Dörzbach includes Dörzbach proper (1465 inhabitants, with the churches of Birkenhöfe and St. Wendel zum Stein) and from the unincorporated former municipalities, Hohebach (with the hamlets Eisenhutsrot, Heßlachshof and Wendischenhof, together 646 inhabitants), Laibach (183 people) and Meßbach (170 inhabitants). In the area of the community of Dörzbach, within the limits set 31 December 1971, are the deserted villages of Albertshof, Dürrenhof and Rortal. In the area of former municipality Hohebach are the towns Lieboldsbronn, Eschbronnen and Ripperg. In the former municipality of Laibach lie the villages of Büchelich and Dacht. In the former municipality Meßbach is found the town Niedermeßbach.

== History ==
Dörzbach was first documented in the Jagst Valley, in 1230, under the name "Torzebach". Tombs and other findings indicate, however, that Dörzbach had been inhabited for millennia by Celtic peoples.

=== Incorporation ===
On 1 January 1972, the communities of Laibach and Meßbach were combined. On 1 January 1974, they were followed by Hohebach.

== Politics ==
=== Town council ===
The local elections on 25 May 2014 had the following seats allocated, as percentages of the town council:

FWG (Free voters)	55.9%	7 seats
CDU	44.1%	6 seats

=== Coat of arms and flag ===
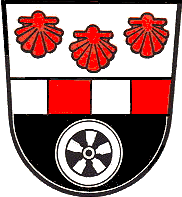

The blazon of arms of Dörzbach is: set as 3 sections, with 4 bars (2 silver & 2 red), a section of three (2-1) red scallop seashells, plus a section in black with a silver five-spoke wheel. The flag of the municipality is red and white.

Emperor Rudolf II granted Dörzbach 27 June 1583 along with the market law, a coat of arms that connected the wheel of the men and haunts the bar from the arms of an extinct local noble family. After the sale of Dörzbach to the Lords of Eyb in 1601, they replaced the Eybschen mussel shells (with the joint turned-up scallops shown), and the wheel in the upper half of the shield. In 1931, the town added to the Berlichingen-lords wheel in the lower (blue) half of the shield. The tinge of the ground shield of arms and shells or wheel figures were adjusted later. The flag of the town was confirmed on 2 February 1970 by the Baden-Württemberg Ministry of the Interior, who awarded the coat of arms.

== Culture and sights ==
In the area of Dörzbach, there are three castles, including a former moated castle of the Lords of Berlichingen, who entered the village in 1371 and replaced the original Dörzbach Lords of Torzebach as local rulers. In 1601, the castle was bought by the Lords of Eyb who own it today. The castle is framed on four sides and the inner courtyard surrounded by outbuildings of a larger outer courtyard. The tower of Holy Trinity Lutheran Church, from the 13th Century, was originally a fortified tower and was part of the area.

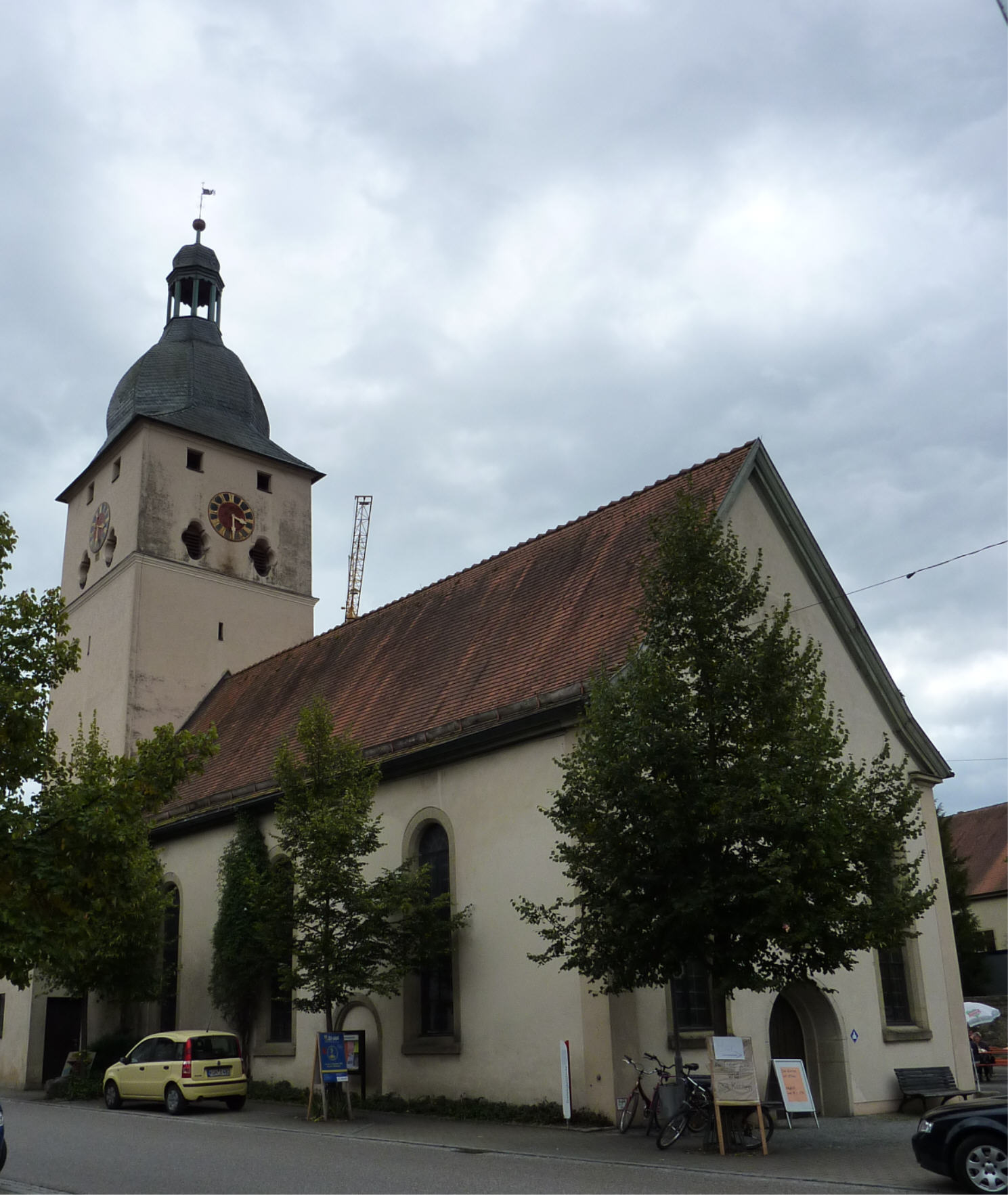
Church in Dörzbach

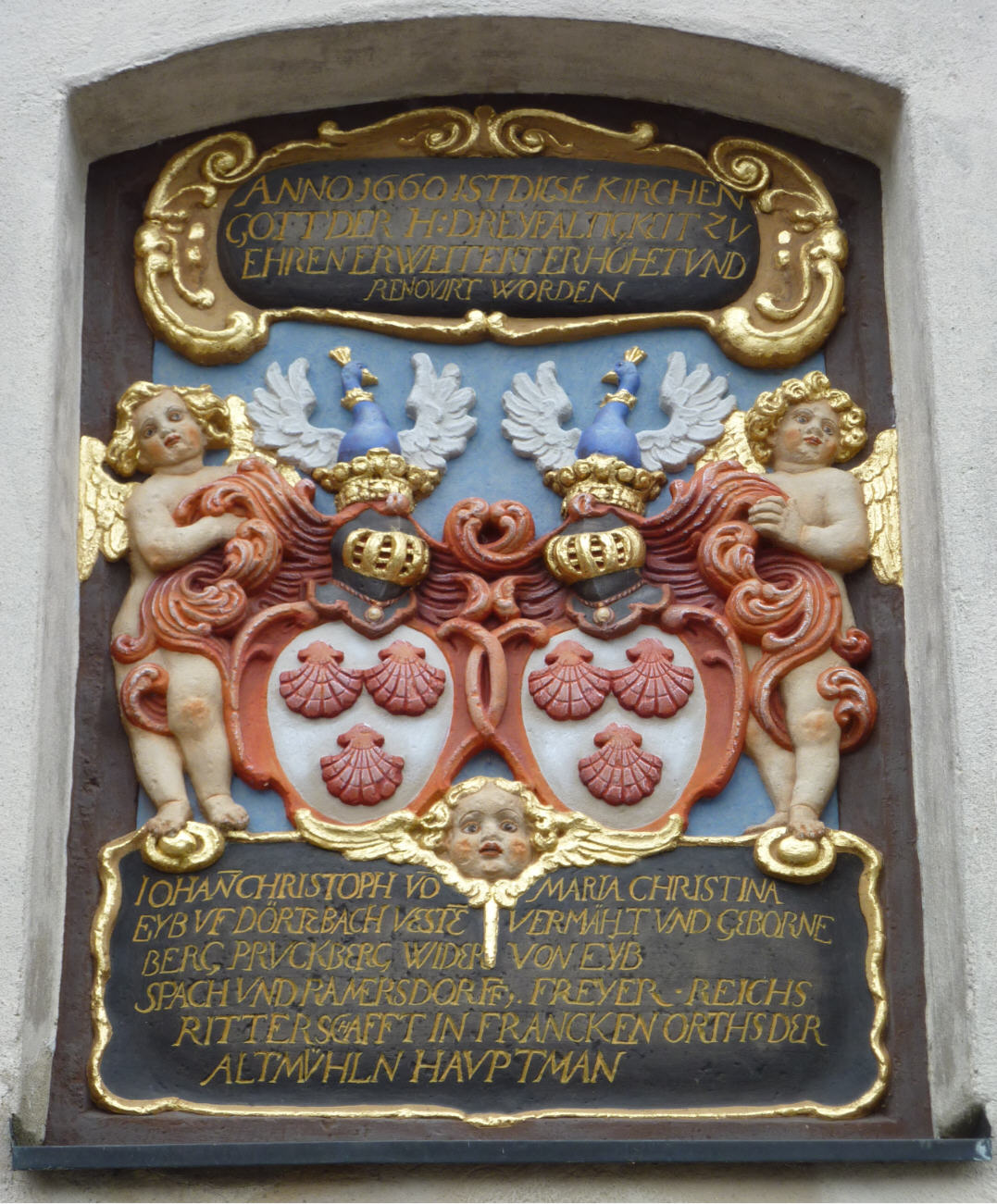
Inscription for renovation by the Family von Eyb

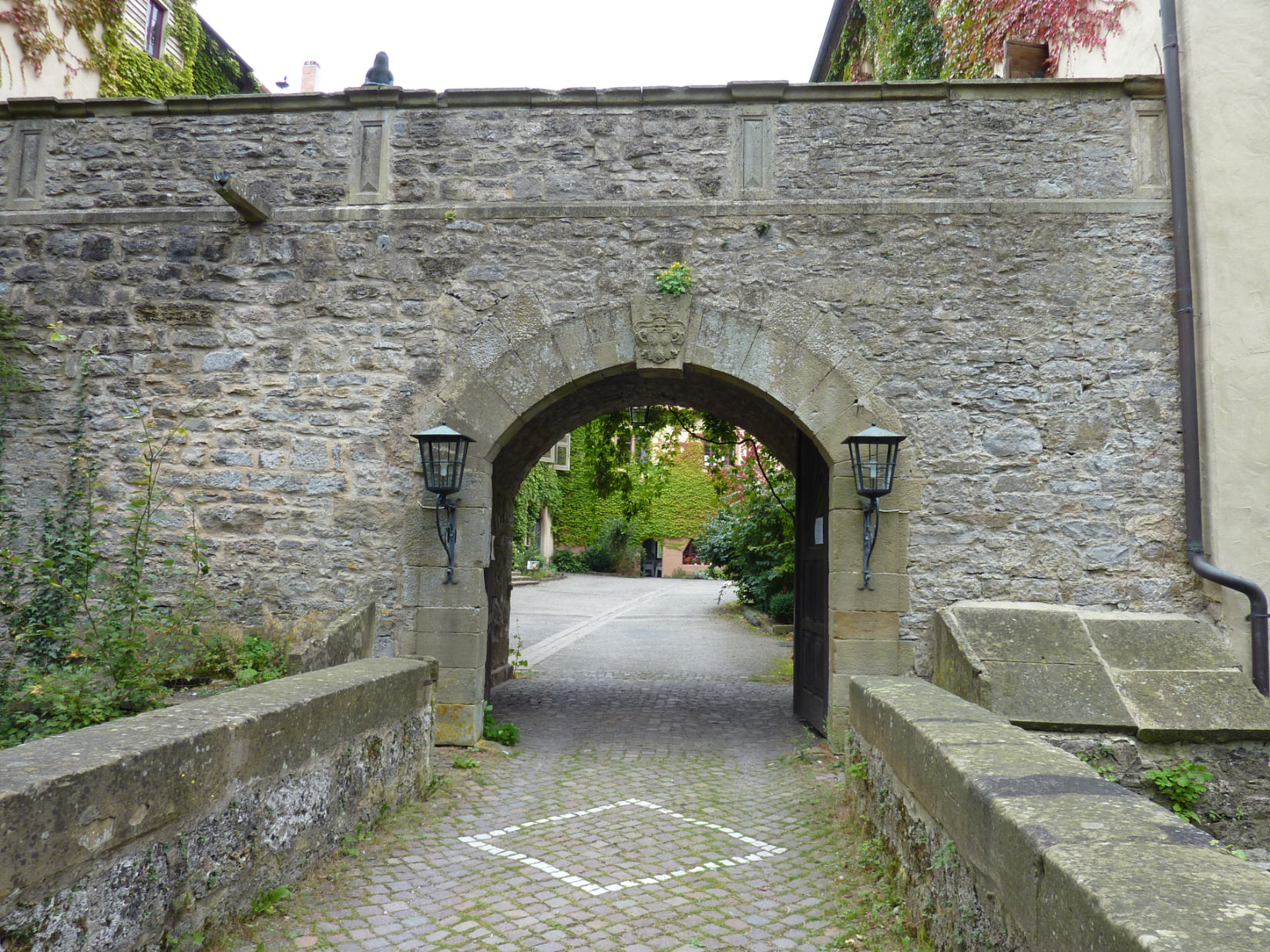
Entrance to courtyard of Schloss Eyb

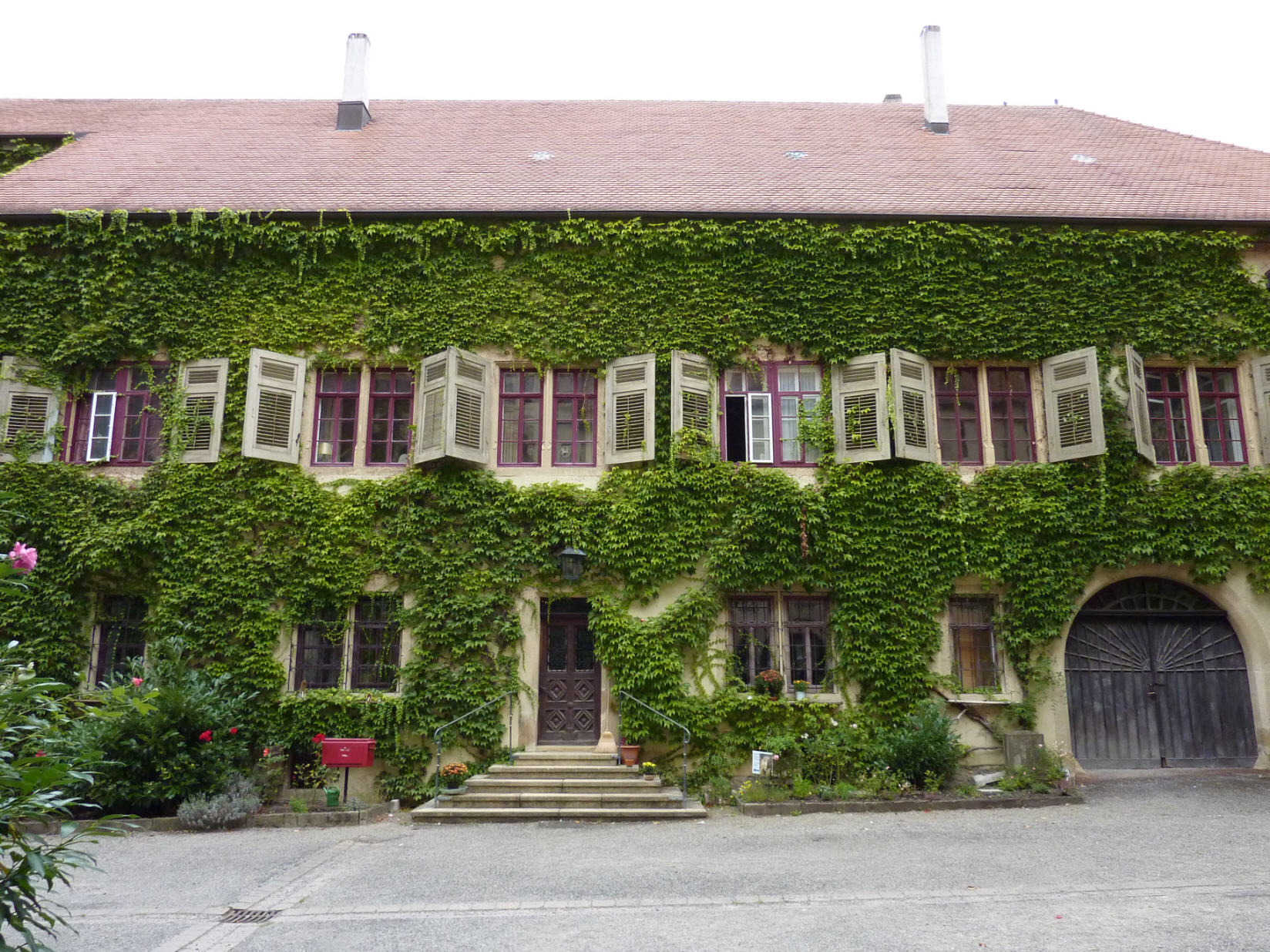
Schloss Eyb castle

Above the hamlet of Laibach is the stronghold of the Barons of Racknitz. Once a strong (robber barons) castle, it was rebuilt in 1621 by Erhard von Muggenthal, as a stately mansion in Renaissance style.

In the area of Messbach, built in 1776, equipped with beautiful ceiling paintings, is the rococo church from the castle of the barons of Palm. It is an elongated Viereckbau, with three floors and four round towers coupled at the corners. The castle was probably built before 1750, but completed only in later years by the Lords of Eyb.

=== Hohebacher Jagst Bridge ===
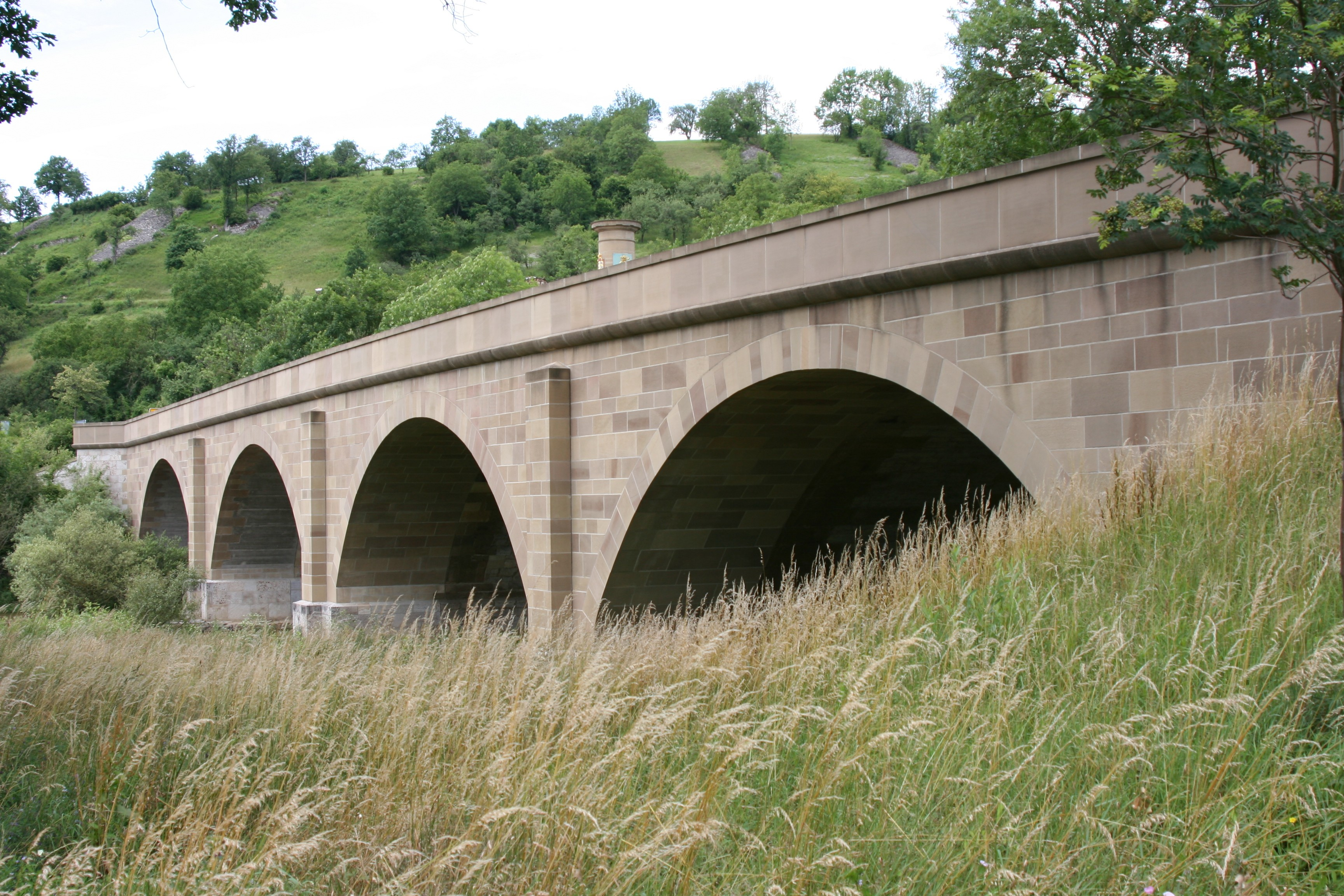
The Hohebacher Jagst Bridge.

As the only partial town, Hohebach has no baron castle, but a real king's bridge: the massive four-arched stone bridge was built from 1808 to 1810 by Karl August Friedrich von Duttenhofer at the behest of King Frederick I of Württemberg, on the fact of his Napoleonic newly acquired northern region Hohenlohe, and strategically wanted better transport links connecting to the Swabian heartland. A high sandstone pillar in the middle of the bridge shows the Roman year MDCCCX (1810) and the royal monogram FR with coat of arms. According to Carl Julius Weber, it is "the most beautiful bridge in the kingdom of Württemberg". Towards the end of World War II, the two north arches were demolished but rebuilt in 1947. During 1996 to 1998, the bridge, which now leads the national road 19, was repaired while maintaining the road construction and widened.

=== St. Wendel zum Stein ===
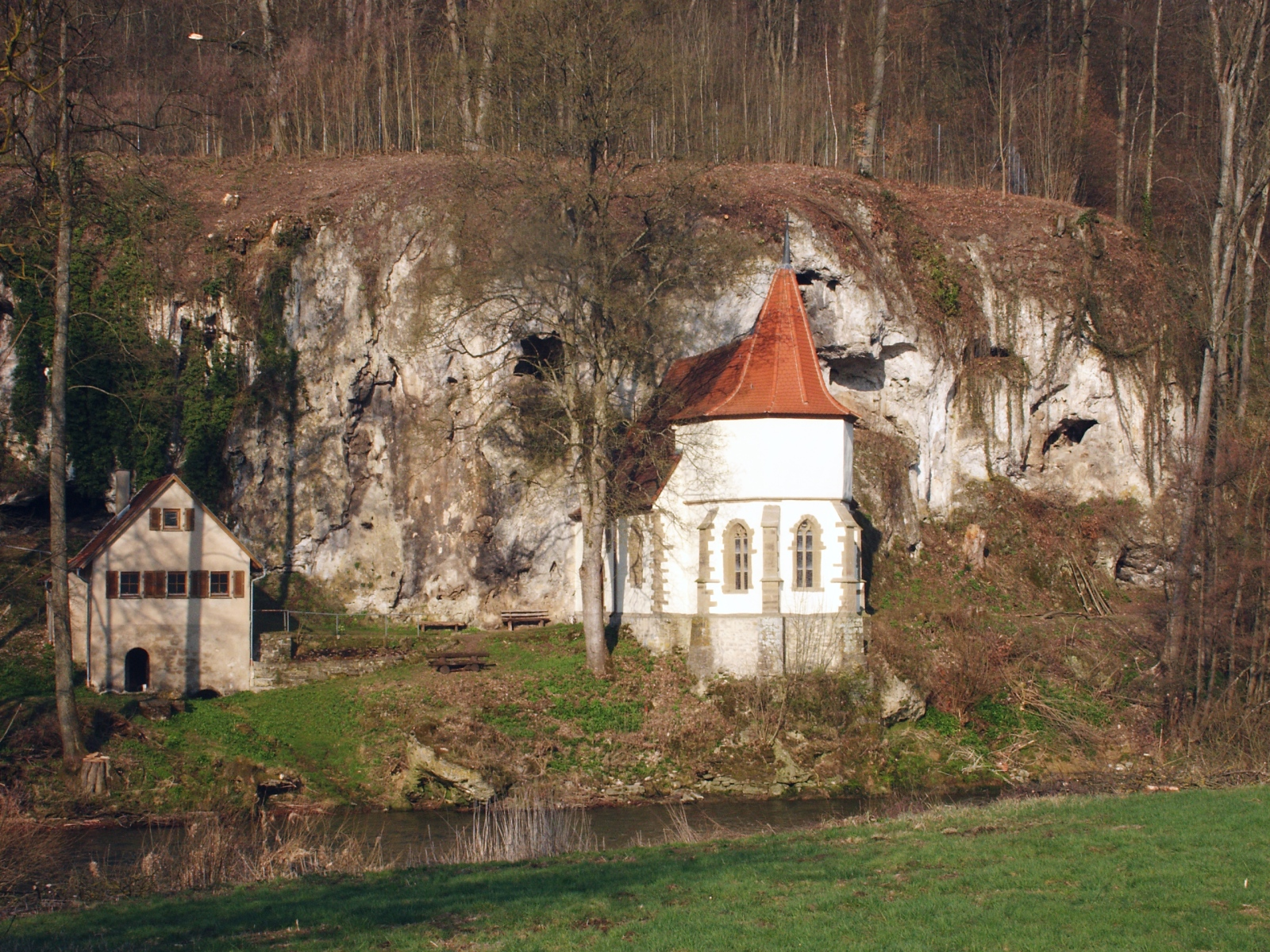
The chapel of St. Wendel zum Stein.

Between Dörzbach and Hohebach is situated, against a limestone-wall hillside (see photo), the chapel St. Wendel zum Stein with Mesnerhaus, in the same nature reserve. In the bands of rock, references are present from previous glacial inhabited caves.

In the chapel, people recently celebrated contemporary church services and prayers. In the summer of 2006, in the middle of Jagst valley, the "Paths to Silence" were dedicated. The Chapel of St. Wendel is integrated into the Dörzbach stretch of the Kocher-Jagst bike path, leading directly above the chapel in the May Day Platz.

=== Memorial ===
Since 1986, there has been a commemorative plaque in the Hohebach section on the building of the former synagogue, the church of Jewish citizens, which was demolished during the November Pogrom of 1938 by the Sturmabteilung (SA) stormtroopers. In the Jewish cemetery, there is a memorial stone for the last eight Jewish inhabitants who were deported in the 1940s and killed.

== Economy and infrastructure ==
=== Jagsttal railway track ===
In Dörzbach, there is the main railway station of Jagsttal, formerly a major regional railway. The Jagsttal track (track width 750 mm, or 30 inches) was always operated as a private-car railway. The execution of the 1888 planned steam tram line from Züttlingen over to Bad Mergentheim Dörzbach was modified to a narrow-gauge railway. The opposite point of the railway was transferred from the larger Züttlingen Möckmühl, where a connection existed at the Main Line Heilbronn-Lauda. The commissioning of the branch line was made in December 1900. Until 1951, there had been freight and passenger transport. Public transport (school transport) resumed temporarily in 1967. In 1971, the German Society of railway history (DGEG) advised, in collaboration with the SWEG here, in the summer months one of the first heritage railway operations (steam locomotives) in Germany. On 23 December 1988, the total line was adjusted for track defects. Efforts to restart between Dörzbach and Krautheim culminated in 2002, with the establishment of the communal Jagsttal Bahn AG.

=== Traffic ===
The Verkehrsbetrieb Dörzbach, a subsidiary of Südwestdeutsche Verkehrs AG (Southwest German Transport Co.), guaranteed public transportation by means of some bus routes. It is the collective urban transport system of Hohenlohe.

The Hag at the southwest of the local part of Wendischenhof Hohebach operates the ultralight club Dörzbach eV, a microlight airfield.

=== Viticulture ===
Dörzbach is a wine community, for the major site Kochersberg belonging to the Kocher-Jagst-Tauber region. The village lies at the Württemberg wine road. The landscape of Altenberg was cross-terraced recently to improve the management of the steep vineyards. The wines are marketed through the village's own cooperative.
