= Hohenlohe (district) =

Coordinates: 49.27°N 9.62°E

- District
- Flag Coat of arms
- Country: Germany
- State: Baden-Württemberg
- Adm. region: Stuttgart
- Capital: Künzelsau

Government
  - District admin.: Matthias Neth (CDU)

Area
  - Total: 776.75 km^{2} (299.90 sq mi)

Population (31 December 2025)
  - Total: 115,601
  - Density: 148.83/km^{2} (385.46/sq mi)
- Time zone: UTC+01:00 (CET)
  - Summer (DST): UTC+02:00 (CEST)
- Vehicle registration: KÜN, ÖHR
- Website: www.hohenlohekreis.de

The Hohenlohe (German: Hohenlohekreis [hoːənˈloːəkʁaɪs]) is a Landkreis (district) in the north of Baden-Württemberg, Germany. Neighboring districts are (from north clockwise) Neckar-Odenwald, Main-Tauber, Schwäbisch Hall and Heilbronn.

Künzelsau is the administrative centre of the district.

== Industry and companies ==
The Hohenlohekreis is host to many internationally active companies in the screws and ventilation industries.

- Würth
- Stahl

== History ==
The district was created in 1973 by merging the previous districts of Öhringen and Künzelsau. It was named after the Hohenlohe family, who had once ruled most of the area until 1806, when they lost their independence as this area became part of the Kingdom of Württemberg.

== Geography ==
The two main rivers of the districts are the Kocher and Jagst, both tributaries of the Neckar. The highest elevation in the district, at 523 m (1,716 ft), is the Mühlberg, near Waldenburg.

== Partnerships ==
Since 1990, the district has had a partnership with the County Limerick in the Republic of Ireland. In the same year, it also started a friendship with the district of Großenhain (now part of the district of Meissen) in Saxony, helping to build the administration according to West German standards.

== Dialect ==
The dialect spoken locally is Hohenlohisch, an East Franconian dialect.

== Coat of arms ==
The coat of arms in its upper part shows two lions, which is the symbol of the family of Hohenlohe, who once had ruled most of the area. The Wheel of Mainz in the lower half is the symbol of the clerical state of Mainz, which also had some possessions around Krautheim.

== Towns and municipalities ==
Clickable map of towns and municipalities in the district

Towns
1. Ingelfingen
2. Künzelsau
3. Öhringen
Municipalities
1. Bretzfeld
2. Pfedelbach
3. Schöntal
4. Zweiflingen

Gemeindeverwaltungsverbände
| 1. Hohenloher Ebene; 1. Kupferzell; 2. Neuenstein^{1,2}; 3. Waldenburg^{2} | 2. Krautheim; 1. Dörzbach; 2. Krautheim^{1,2}; 3. Mulfingen | 3. Mittleres Kochertal; 1. Forchtenberg^{2}; 2. Niedernhall^{1,2}; 3. Weißbach |
^{1}seat of the Gemeindeverwaltungsverband; ^{2}town
