= Schloss Waldenburg =

Waldenburg Castle
- Schloss Waldenburg
- Part of Waldenburg, Baden-Württemberg
- Waldenburg in Germany
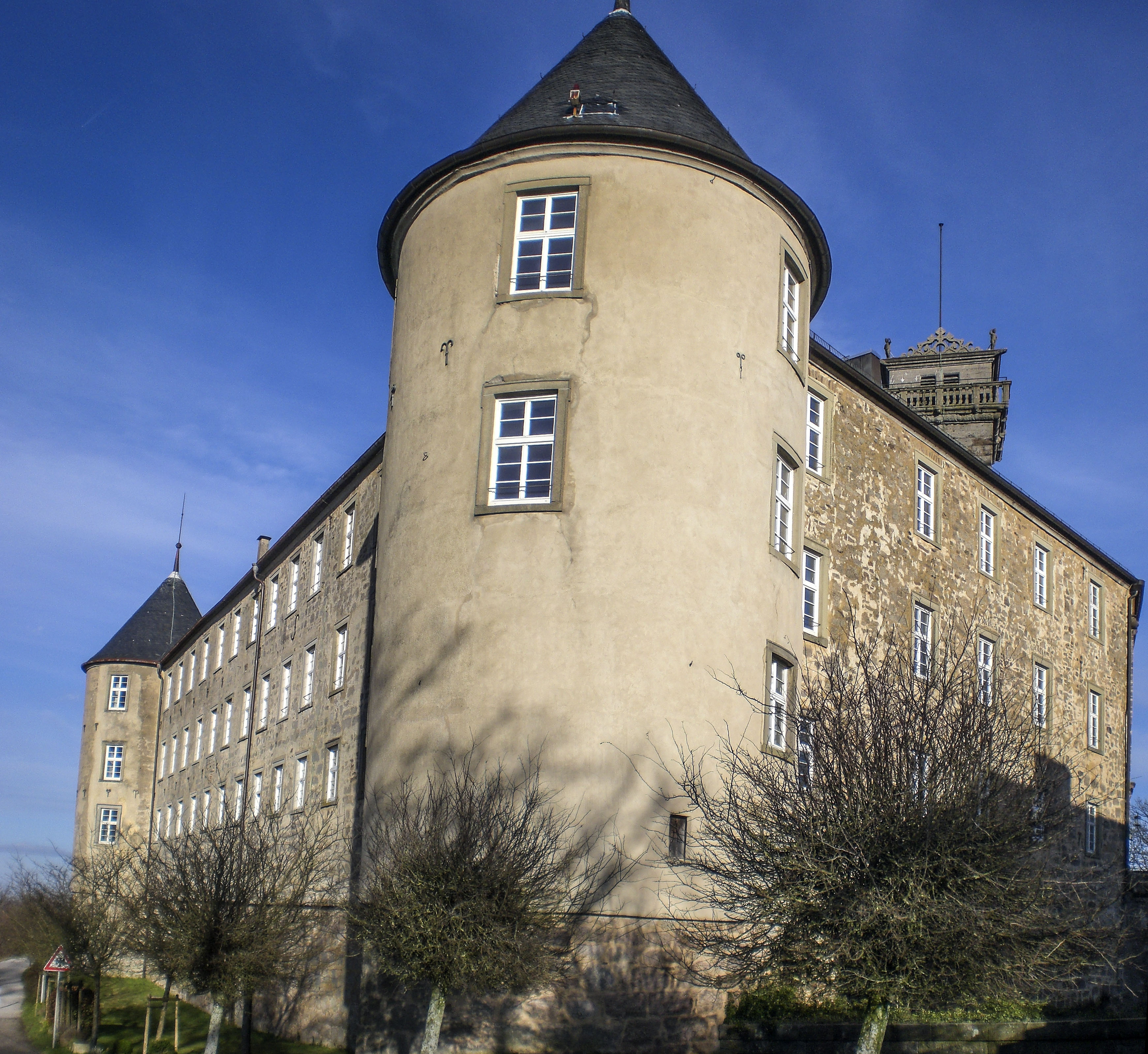

Site information
- Type: Castle (Burg)
- Owner: Hohenlohe family
- Condition: Restored (partially)

Location
- Location with Germany Waldenburg Castle (Germany)
- Coordinates: 49°11′27.7″N 9°38′34.7″E

Site history
- Built: 13th century
- Events: World War II (destroyed)

Waldenburg Castle (German: Schloss Waldenburg) is a 13th-century castle lying on a mountain on the outskirts of Waldenburg, Germany.

== History ==
Since 1250, the town and castle were owned by the House of Hohenlohe. During the Second World War, the castle and town were destroyed.

While the town has been rebuilt, the castle was only partially rebuilt. The present owner is Felix zu Hohenlohe-Waldenburg-Schillingsfürst, 10th Prince of Hohenlohe-Waldenburg-Schillingsfürst (b. 1963).
