= Barbara Franziska of Welz-Wilmersdorf =

Franziska Barbara of Welz-Wilmersdorf
- Born: 4 August 1666
- Died: 3 April 1718 (aged 51); Wilhermsdorf
- Spouse: Wolfgang Julius, Count of Hohenlohe-Neuenstein
- Father: Francis of Welz-Eberstein
- Mother: Anna Barbara de Gun

Franziska Barbara of Welz-Wilmersdorf (4 August 1666 – 3 April 1718 in Wilhermsdorf) was baroness of Wilhermsdorf. She was the daughter of Francis of Welz-Eberstein (1635–1674), Count of Welz, Baron of Eberstein, and Anna Barbara de Gun (1640 – c. 1681), daughter of William Gunn (born 1600), Freiherr von Ulm.

She married in 1689 the much older Count Wolfgang Julius of Hohenlohe-Neuenstein, widower of Sophie Eleonore of Schleswig-Holstein-Sonderburg-Plön. Wolfgang Julius died in 1698 after nine years of marriage at the age of 76. The marriage remained childless. The legacy of her husband fell to his brother, John Frederick I of Hohenlohe-Öhringen; Franziska Barbara only received the Lordships of Wilhermsdorf and Neidhardswinden, which Wolfgang Julius had bought on 4 May 1667.

Three years later, in 1701, she married a 35-year-old second husband, Count Philip Ernest of Hohenlohe-Waldenburg-Schillingsfürst (born: 29 December 1663; died: 29 November 1759). Franziska Barbara retained her residence at Wilhermsdorf. She had renovated the palace considerably. Under her rule Wilhermsdorf experienced its heyday. She realized the construction of the church Julius Wolfgang had planned in the years between 1706 and 1714. Between 1707 and 1718, she built the school house in Burgmilchlingstraße, the hospital in Spitalstraße, the Consultant House building (now Wilhermsdorf City Hall) and the Gottesacke Church. In Wilhermsdorf she is described as the "benefactress of Wilhermsdorf" even today. On 3 April 1718, she died at the age of 51 years. She was ceremoniously buried in a magnificent sarcophagus in the crypt of the main Protestant church.

From her second marriage to Philip Ernest she had at least one daughter:

- Caroline Juliane of Hohenlohe-Waldenburg-Schillingsfürst (1706–1758), married Christian Otto of Limburg-Styrum (1694–1749).

After her death Philip Ernest married his second wife, Countess Maria Anna of Oettingen-Wallerstein.

After Philip Ernest's death, was the fiefs Wilhermsdorf and Neidhardswinden fell to his underage children. In 1733, Philip Ernest's son took up the rule of Wilhermsdorf. He, too, remained childless, so that in 1769 (or earlier), Wilhermsdorf fell to Philip Ferdinand of Limburg-Styrum, the son of Franziska Barbara's daughter Caroline Juliane.
