= Heinrich Vogtherr =

German artist (1490–1556)

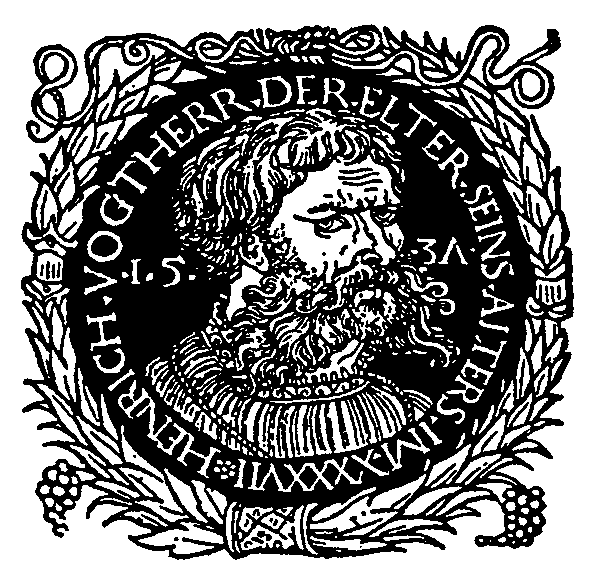
Heinrich Vogtherr the Elder, self-portrait, 1537 (woodcut)

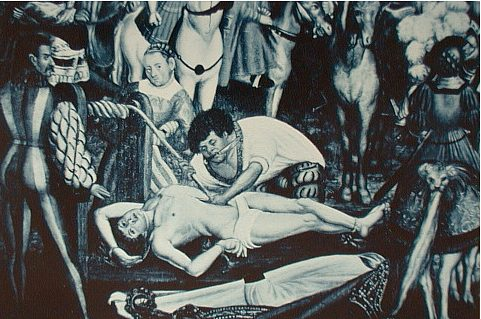
Martyrdom of Saint Erasmus, 1516 (detail)

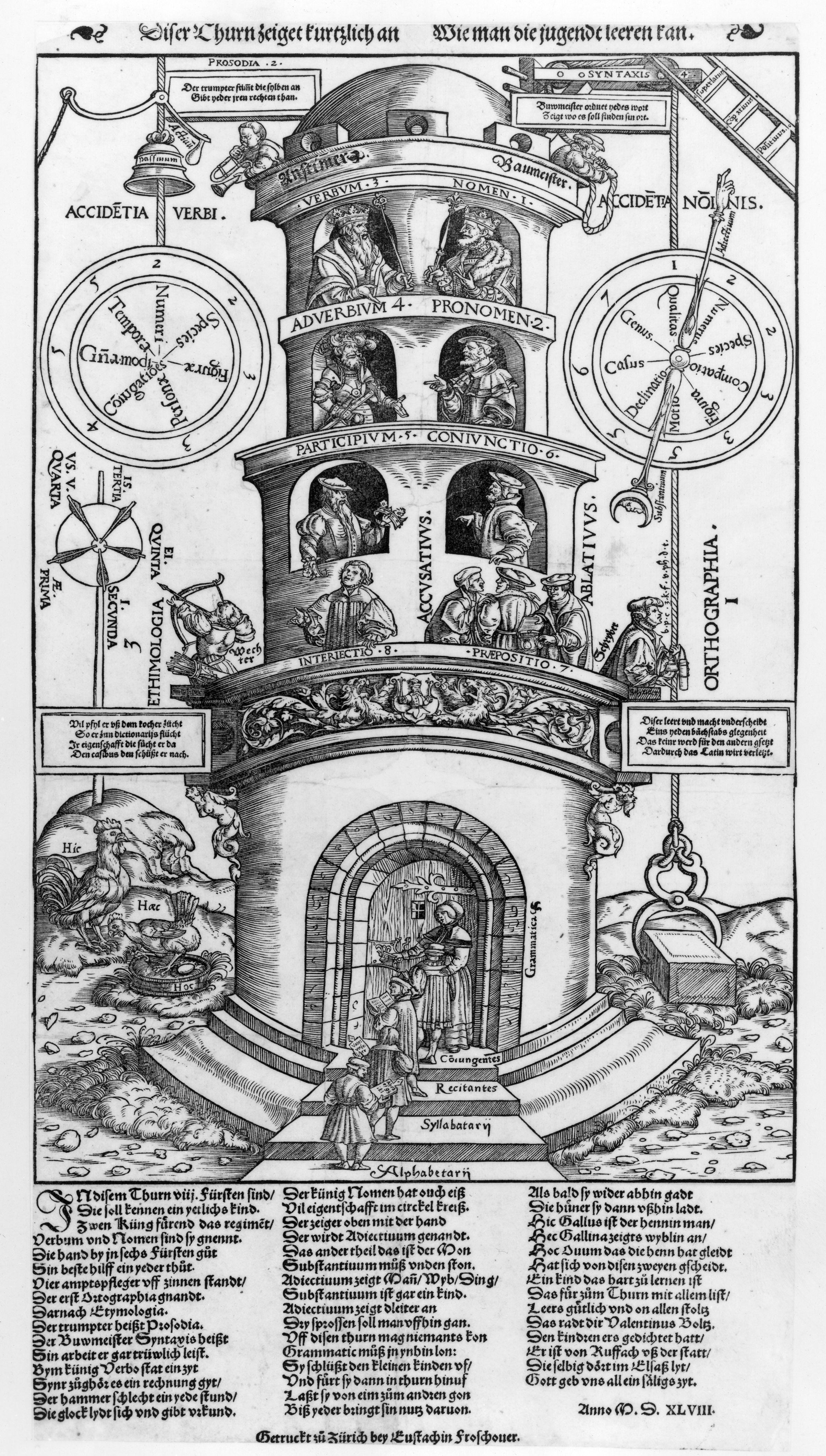
The Tower of Grammar, 1548

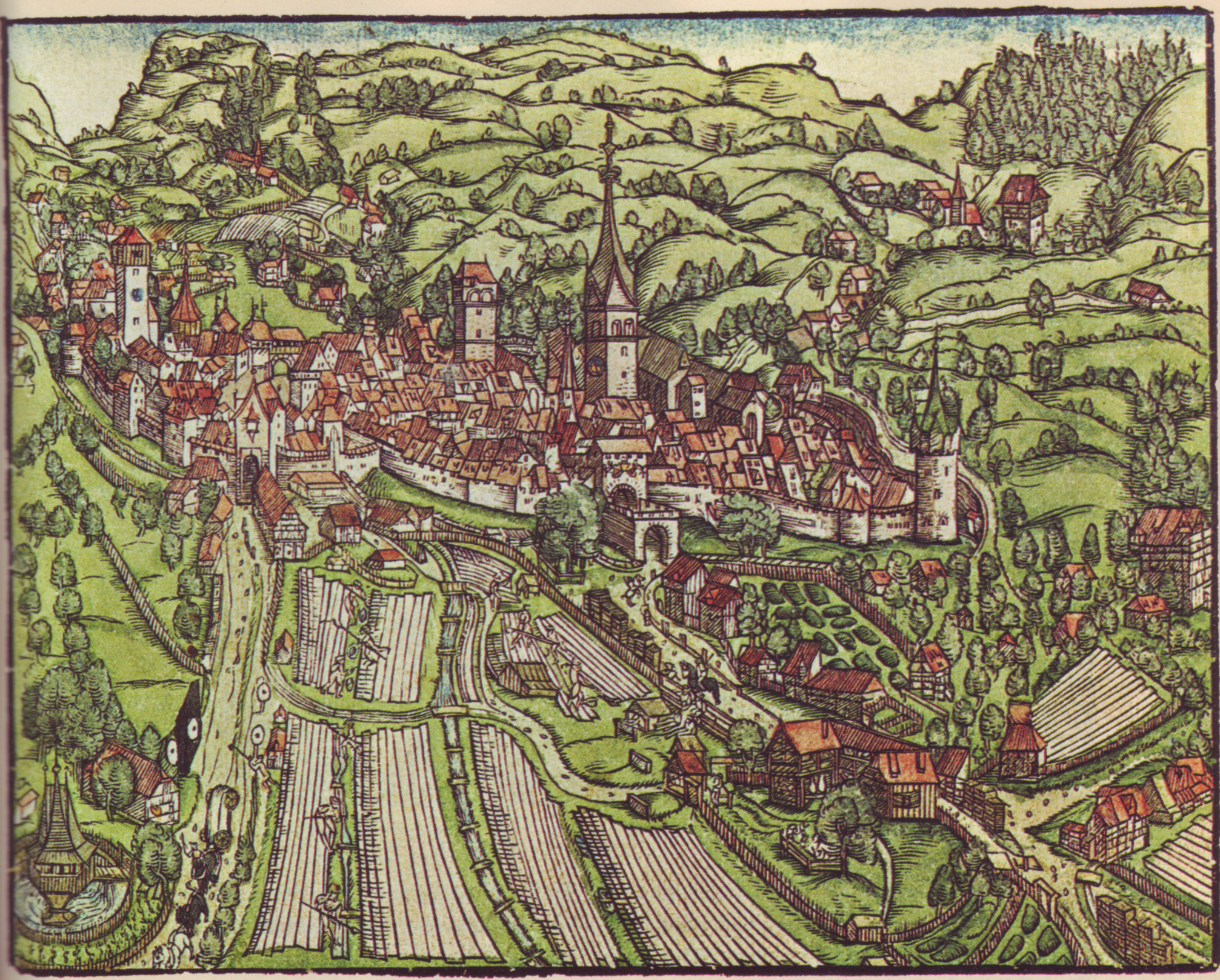
View of St. Gallen, 1545

Heinrich Vogtherr (the Elder) (1490 in Dillingen an der Donau – 1556 in Vienna) was an artist, printer, poet and medical author of the Reformation period.

== Early life ==
Vogtherr was born in Dillingen an der Donau, his father Conrad was an eye doctor and surgeon. His brother Georg (1487-1539) preached as a priest and reformer, and his brother Bartholomew (149?-1536) was the Bishop of Augsburg and author of medical books. His son was the painter Heinrich Vogtherr the Younger (1513-1568). Vogtherr's art training seems to have taken place in Augsburg. It is believed that in 1506-1509 he studied under Hans Burgkmair. His years of travel led him to Erfurt and Leipzig. In 1518 he returned to Augsburg and assisted in painting and writing a large part of his work, the doctrine of Martin Luther ("The sale of indulgences in a church", the "dead eaters"). Between 1522 and 1525 he lived in Bad Wimpfen to paint frescoes for the parish church on behalf of the Reformation-minded Hans Dietrich von Gemmingen. He also published in the spirit of the Reformation numerous writings and pamphlets like "The deified man", or "The Bom (tree) of faith". His most beautiful spiritual song poem "Out of the depths I cry to you", he handed out there in 1524 as a broadsheet.

== War ==
In Wimpfen Vogtherr was with the peasant leader Wendel Hipler and also had contact with Götz von Berlichingen, which is how he got involved in the German Peasants' War. As colonel of Hegauer farmers, he was involved in mid 1524 until the end (in July 1525) where they failed siege of cell (Radolfzell) on Lake Constance there. He managed to escape and was several months later safely found in the reformation friendly Strasbourg, where he in 1526 settled with his family. Due to the local religious situation, however, his booking orders for his works had greatly reduced. He also volunteered to defend the city of Vienna after it was put under siege by the Ottoman Empire under Suleiman the Magnificent during the Siege of Vienna in 1529.

== Later career ==
From the Strasbourg artists of that time actually only Hans Baldung, one of the most important painters of the time of Dürer, was considered for any painting jobs (mainly portraits), which is why Vogtherr now found his living mainly in the production of book illustrations. He has worked for almost all of the Strasbourg printers. In 1536 he founded his own printer business in which he printed only his own works, such as "Christian Losbuch", two "Anatomies", and the immensely popular, several times reprinted "Art Booklet", a type specimen book for artisans. Starting in 1538, he began lived for a while in Basel. His family in Strasbourg he would only sporadically see (as of 1542), as if he was forced, for financial reasons, to travel around all the time. So he went to Speyer, Basel, back to Strasbourg, several times to Augsburg and finally to Zurich, where he lived from 1544 to 1546 at Christoph Froschauer's premier printing workshop. For whose workshop he created in this relatively short period, a surprisingly comprehensive and quality- full work, including more than 400 woodcuts for the "Swiss chronicle" (1547/48) by Johannes Stumpf. Vogtherr's finally had to leave Strasbourg due to the lack of jobs for book illustrations. In 1550, he was summoned to Vienna by Ferdinand I, Holy Roman Emperor (Emperor at that time was still his brother Charles V who abdicated in 1556, the year of Vogtherr's death).

== Personal life ==
Vogtherr was married three times and father of seven sons and three daughters. He also periodically used the pseudonym "Henricus (or Heinrich) Satrapitanus", signing works "H.P.".
