= Kupferzell =

- Municipality
- Coat of arms

- Location of Kupferzell within Hohenlohekreis district
- Interactive map of Kupferzell
- Location within Germany Location within Baden-Württemberg
- Coordinates: 49°14′N 9°41′E
- Country: Germany
- State: Baden-Württemberg
- Admin. region: Stuttgart
- District: Hohenlohekreis
- Municipal assoc.: Hohenloher Ebene
- Subdivisions: 21

Government
  - Mayor (2019–27): Christoph Spieles

Area
  - Total: 54.28 km^{2} (20.96 sq mi)
- Elevation: 340 m (1,120 ft)

Population (2025-12-31)
  - Total: 6,663
  - Density: 122.8/km^{2} (317.9/sq mi)
- Time zone: UTC+01:00 (CET)
  - Summer (DST): UTC+02:00 (CEST)
- Postal codes: 74635
- Dialling codes: 07944
- Vehicle registration: KÜN, ÖHR
- Website: www.kupferzell.de

Kupferzell (German pronunciation: [kʊp͡fɐˈt͡sɛl]) is a small German town in the district of Hohenlohe in Baden-Württemberg, Germany named after the Kupfer river flowing through it. The largest neighbouring towns are Künzelsau (to the north) and Schwäbisch Hall (to the south).

== History ==
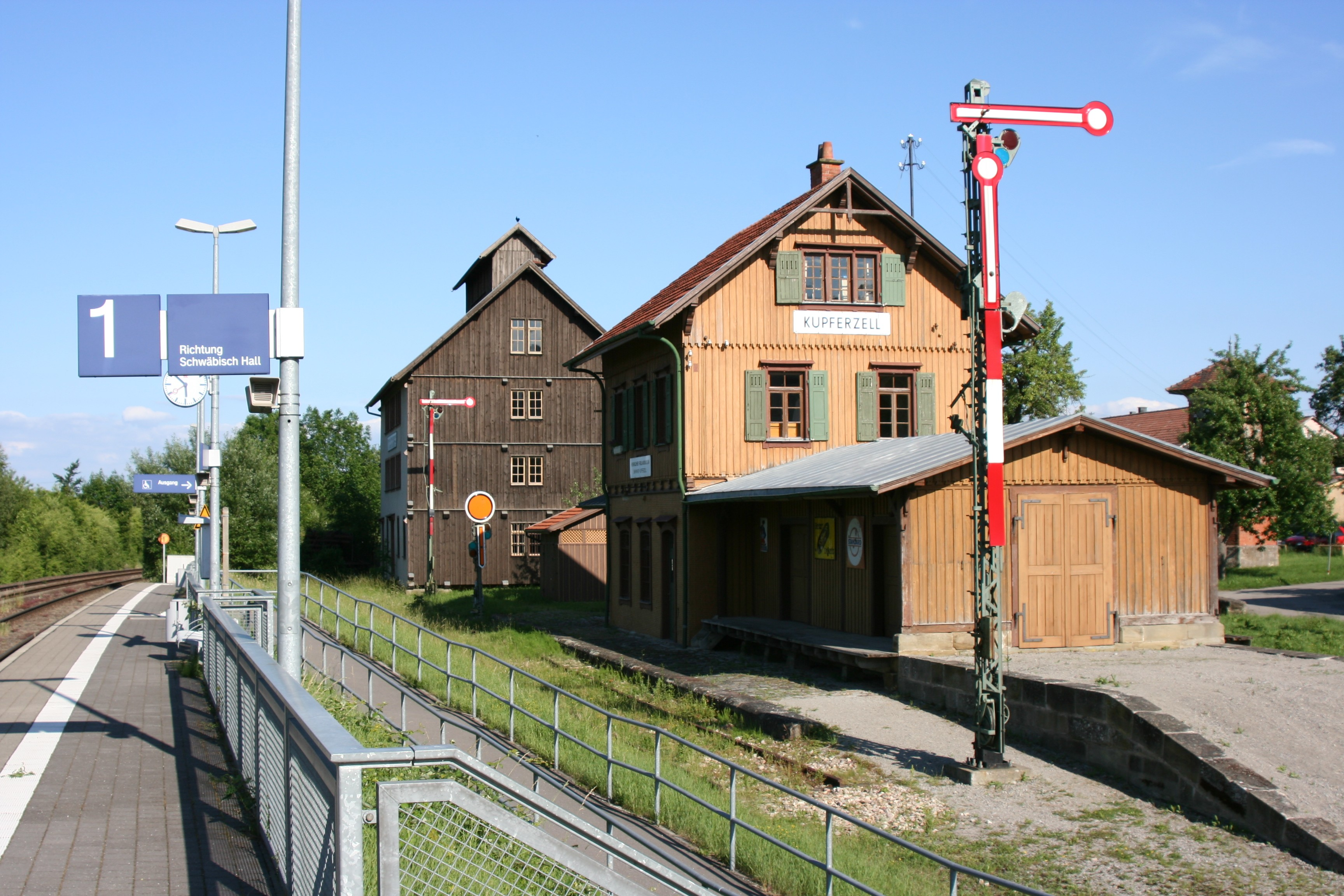
Kupferzell old station, now at Wackershofen open air museum

Kupferzell was first mentioned in 1236 and as early as the 14th century, the Count of Hohenlohe owned property there.

During the late Middle Ages, Kupferzell always was referred to as "Celle", with a closer localization of "uf dem Ornwaldt". It was only in the 15th century that the current name appeared after its location on the Kupfer (river). From 1721 to 1727/1729, Count Philipp Ernst had a castle built here. From 1767 until 1884 Kupferzell was the residence of the duke of Hohenlohe-Waldenburg-Schillingsfürst; after mediatization in 1806, Kupferzell became part of the Königreich Württemberg under administration of the High Office of Öhringen.

On January 1, 1972, Kupferzell fused with Eschental, Feßbach, Mangoldsall, Goggenbach and Westernach to the town of Kupferzell.

In March 2020, the town was particularly affected by COVID-19 and became one of Germany's hotspots in the Hohenlohe district. Mid May, the Robert Koch-Institut started a seroepidemiology study named "Corona Monitoring lokal" attempting to enroll 2,000 of the town's 6,000 inhabitants for antibody testing and a throat swab for SARS-CoV-2.

== Demographics ==
Population development:

Year	Inhabitants
1990	4,633
2001	5,656
2011	5,715
2021	6,318

== Notable people ==
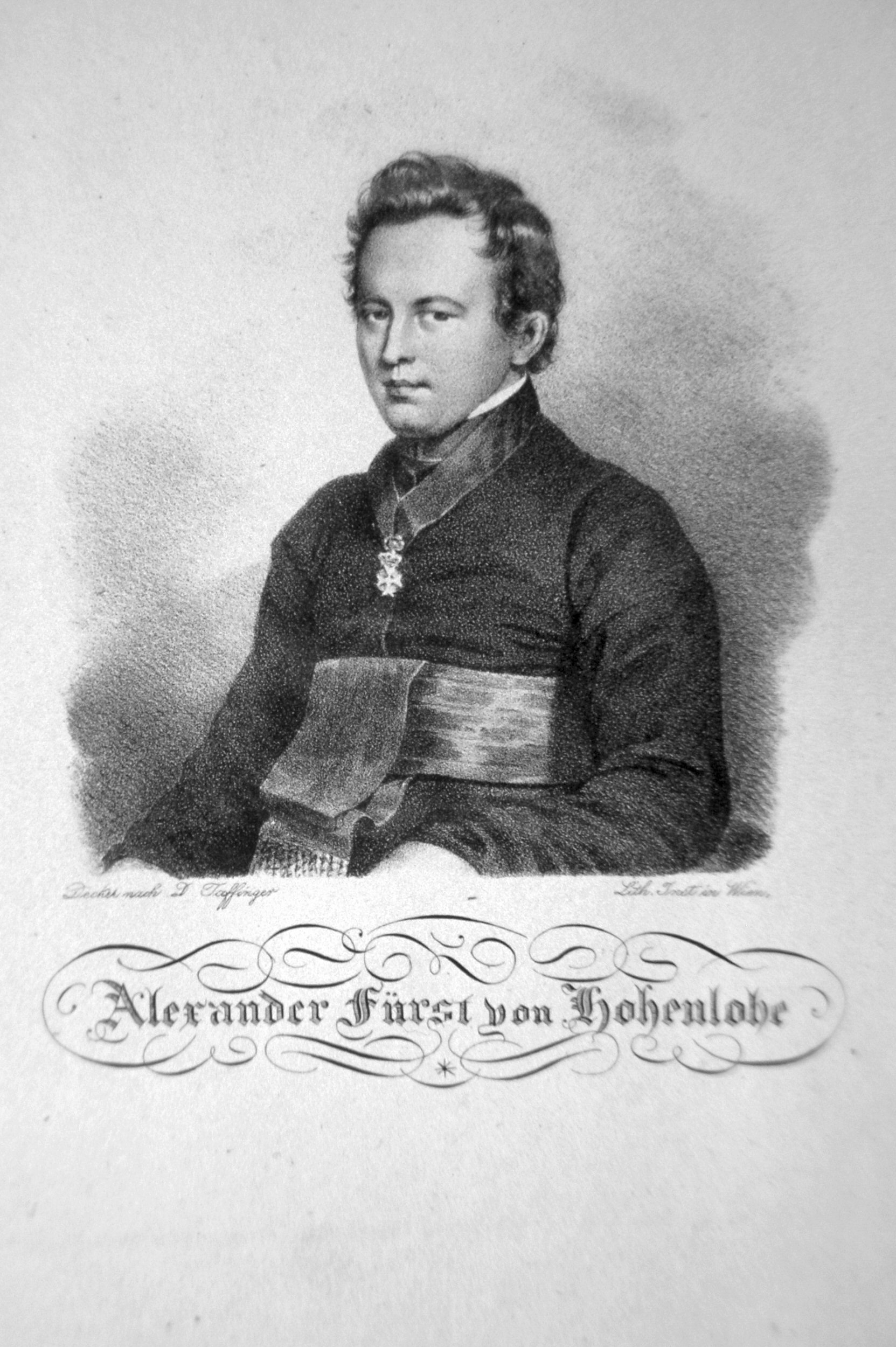
Alexander Hohenlohe around 1825

- Prince Alexander of Hohenlohe-Waldenburg-Schillingsfürst (1794–1849), Catholic priest
- Eberhard Finckh, (1899–1944), career officer and resistance fighter of 20 July 1944
