= Hipler =

Hipler is a German surname. Notable people with the surname include:

- Elke Hipler (born 1978), German rower
- Wendel Hipler (1465–1526), nobleman in Franconia and supporter of the local peasant revolt

== See also ==
- Hippler
