= Wolfgang Julius, Count of Hohenlohe-Neuenstein =

Wolfgang Julius
- Count of Hohenlohe-Neuenstein
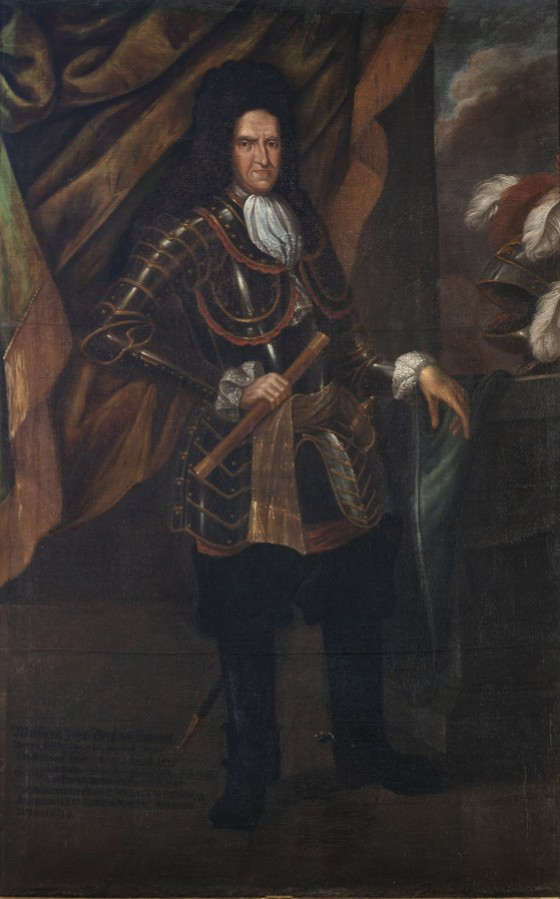
- Wolfgang Julius, Count of Hohenlohe-Neuenstein
- Born: 3 August 1622; Neuenstein, Baden-Württemberg
- Died: 26 December 1698 (aged 76); Neuenstein, Baden-Württemberg
- Noble family: House of Hohenlohe
- Spouses: Sophie Eleanor of Schleswig-Holstein-Sonderburg-Plön; Barbara Franziska of Welz-Wilmersdorf
- Father: Kraft III of Hohenlohe-Neuenstein
- Mother: Sophie of Palatinate-Zweibrücken-Birkenfeld

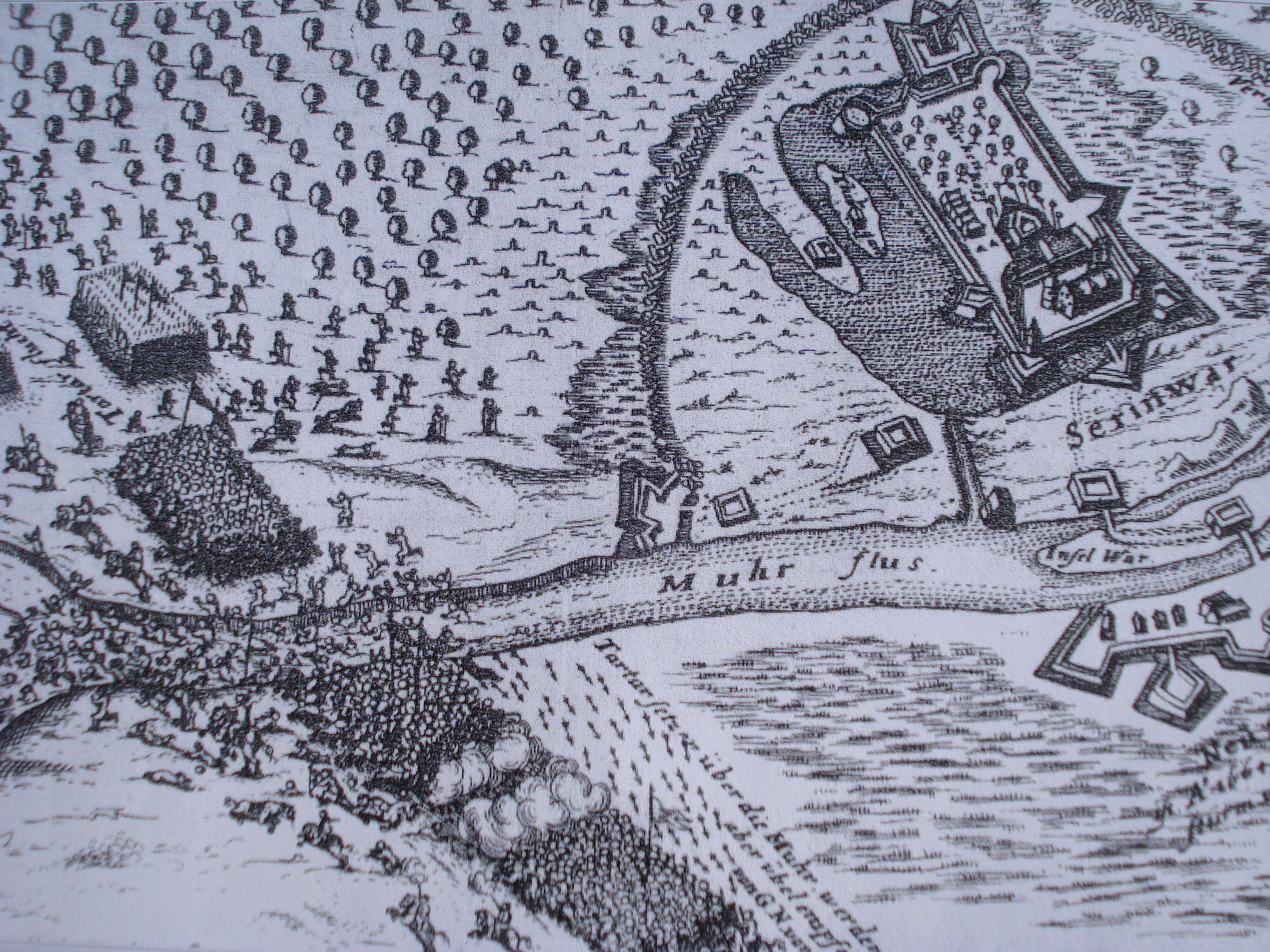
Together with Nikola VII Zrinski, Ban of Croatia, Hohenlohe was commanding general at the siege of Novi Zrin in northern Croatia

Wolfgang Julius of Hohenlohe-Neuenstein (3 August 1622, Neuenstein – 26 December 1698) was a German Field Marshal and the last Count of Hohenlohe-Neuenstein. He was the son of Kraft III of Hohenlohe-Neuenstein (14 November 1582, Langenburg – 11 September 1641, Regensburg) and Sophie of Birkenfeld (29 March 1593, Ansbach – 16 November 1676, Neuenstein), a daughter of Charles I, Count Palatine of Zweibrücken-Birkenfeld.

== Life ==
During the Thirty Years' War the Hohenlohe Family had fled to Ohrdruf. In 1637, when he was 15 years old, Wolfgang Julius was stopped by a patrol and wounded in the face through a glancing shot. In 1643 he went on his Grand Tour to France. To earn money, he entered the regiment of the Imperial Marshal Josias Rantzau, where he was involved in a cabal, which earned him seven months imprisonment.

He returned home in 1657. There he became lieutenant-general of the troops of the League of the Rhine, which were set up to defend against the Turks in the Balkans. Wolfgang Julius was stationed in Styria. From 1664, he fought in Hungary and Croatia. He distinguished himself at the sieges of Pécs and Novi Zrin Castle which failed because the army was not unanimous. After the successful Battle of Mogersdorf he became field marshal, and returned to Hohenlohe with 800 men from the original 6500.

He bought the lordship of Wilhermsdorf, near Nuremberg, and retired there. Since both his marriages were childless, his inheritance passed to his brother, John Frederick I of Hohenlohe-Oehringen.

== Marriage ==
He married twice. On 25 August 1666 he married Sophie Eleanor of Holstein-Sonderburg-Plön (1 August 1644, Plön – 22 January 1689, Neuenstein), daughter of Joachim Ernest, Duke of Schleswig-Holstein-Sonderburg-Plön (1622–1671).

After her death he married on 4 September 1689 in Wilhermsdorf Countess Barbara Franziska of Welz-Wilmersdorf (4 August 1666 – 3 April 1718, Wilhermsdorf).

== Sources ==
- Joachim Ernst I Herzog von Schleswig-Holstein-Sonderburg-Plön
