= Hohenloher Ebene =

- Gemeindeverwaltungsverband
- Location of Hohenloher Ebene within Hohenlohe district
- Interactive map of Hohenloher Ebene
- Location within Germany Location within Baden-Württemberg
- Coordinates: 49°12′N 9°36′E
- Country: Germany
- State: Baden-Württemberg
- Admin. region: Stuttgart
- District: Hohenlohe
- Seat: Neuenstein
- Subdivisions: 3 municipalities

Area
  - Total: 133.67 km^{2} (51.61 sq mi)

Population (2025-12-31)
  - Total: 16,206
  - Density: 121.24/km^{2} (314.01/sq mi)
- Time zone: UTC+01:00 (CET)
  - Summer (DST): UTC+02:00 (CEST)

Hohenloher Ebene is a Gemeindeverwaltungsverband in the district of Hohenlohe in Baden-Württemberg, Germany. The seat of the Gemeindeverwaltungsverband is in Neuenstein.

The Gemeindeverwaltungsverband Hohenloher Ebene consists of the following municipalities:

1. Kupferzell
2. Neuenstein
3. Waldenburg
