= Eberhard Finckh =

German colonel and longtime opponent of Nazism

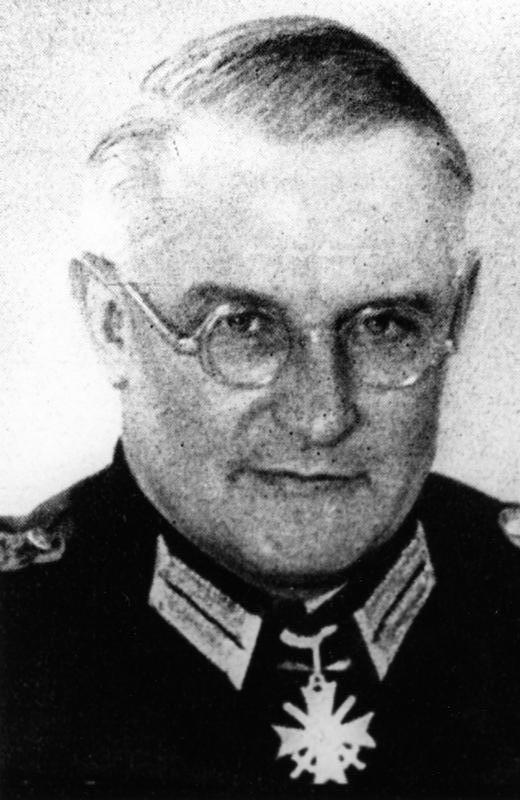
- Finckh in 1941
- Born: 7 November 1899; Kupferzell, Kingdom of Württemberg, German Empire
- Died: 30 August 1944 (aged 44); Plötzensee Prison, Berlin, Nazi Germany
- Military career
- Allegiance: German Empire; Weimar Republic; Nazi Germany
- Branch: German Army
- Service years: 1917–1944
- Rank: Oberst
- Commands: Quartermaster of the German Army in the west
- Conflicts: World War I World War II

Eberhard Finckh (7 November 1899 – 30 August 1944) was a German colonel on the general staff of the German Army, a longtime opponent of Nazism and a member of the German resistance to Adolf Hitler's regime.

== Biography ==
Finckh was born in Kupferzell and grew up in Urach and Stuttgart. He joined the Imperial Army in 1917 and then was a member of the Reichswehr. In 1927 he was posted to the War Academy in Berlin-Moabit, where he later met Claus Schenk Graf von Stauffenberg. In World War II he first served in Poland and on the Eastern Front as quartermaster of the 6th Army and in 1943 for Army Group South. He then served under General Günther Blumentritt as the chief quartermaster to the commander-in-chief in Paris, and he was involved in planning the coup attempt in the West linked to the 20 July plot with Colonel-General Carl-Heinrich von Stülpnagel and his adjutant Lieutenant-Colonel Cäsar von Hofacker.

On 20 July he was notified by telephone from Zossen that Hitler had been assassinated. Along with other officers, he was called to a meeting in von Stülpnagel's office and was issued with prearranged orders for the arrest of senior Gestapo, SS, and SD personnel in Paris.

After the failure of the coup attempt, he was arrested by the Gestapo, interrogated at length, and dishonorably discharged from the army by a court of honor. He was then tried by the People's Court on 30 August 1944 with von Stülpnagel, who had blinded himself in a suicide attempt, Caesar von Hofacker, and Ottfried von Linstow. He was sentenced to death by Roland Freisler and executed by hanging the same day at the Plötzensee prison in Berlin.

== See also ==
- List of members of the 20 July plot
