= Hippler =

Hippler is a German surname. Notable people with the surname include:

- Fritz Hippler (1909–2002), German film director
- Werner Hippler (born 1970), German-born Canadian player of American football

== See also ==
- Hipler
