= Neuenstein, Baden-Württemberg =

Neuenstein
- Town
- Coat of arms

- Location of Neuenstein within Hohenlohekreis district
- Interactive map of Neuenstein
- Location within Germany Location within Baden-Württemberg
- Coordinates: 49°12′N 9°35′E
- Country: Germany
- State: Baden-Württemberg
- Admin. region: Stuttgart
- District: Hohenlohekreis
- Municipal assoc.: Hohenloher Ebene
- Subdivisions: 7

Government
  - Mayor (2023–31): Karl Michael Nicklas

Area
  - Total: 47.84 km^{2} (18.47 sq mi)
- Elevation: 284 m (932 ft)

Population (2025-12-31)
  - Total: 6,556
  - Density: 137.0/km^{2} (354.9/sq mi)
- Time zone: UTC+01:00 (CET)
  - Summer (DST): UTC+02:00 (CEST)
- Postal codes: 74632
- Dialling codes: 07942
- Vehicle registration: KÜN, ÖHR
- Website: www.neuenstein.de

Neuenstein (German pronunciation: [ˈnɔʏənˌʃtaɪn]) is a town in the Hohenlohe district, in Baden-Württemberg, Germany. It is situated 12 km southwest of Künzelsau, and 27 km east of Heilbronn.

The 16th-century castle, home to H.S.H. the prince of Hohenlohe-Oehringen, is open to visitors.

== Villages ==
Neuenstein consists of the following 7 villages:

Area and population as of 30 June 2019
	Area in ha	Population	Coat of arms
Kirchensall	1.406	819	Kirchensall's coat of arms
Kleinhirschbach	863	392	Neuenstein's coat of arms
Grünbühl	579	525	Grünbühl's coat of arms
Kesselfeld	378	235	Kesselfeld's coat of arms
Eschelbach	332	543	Eschelbach's coat of arms
Obersöllbach	482	319	

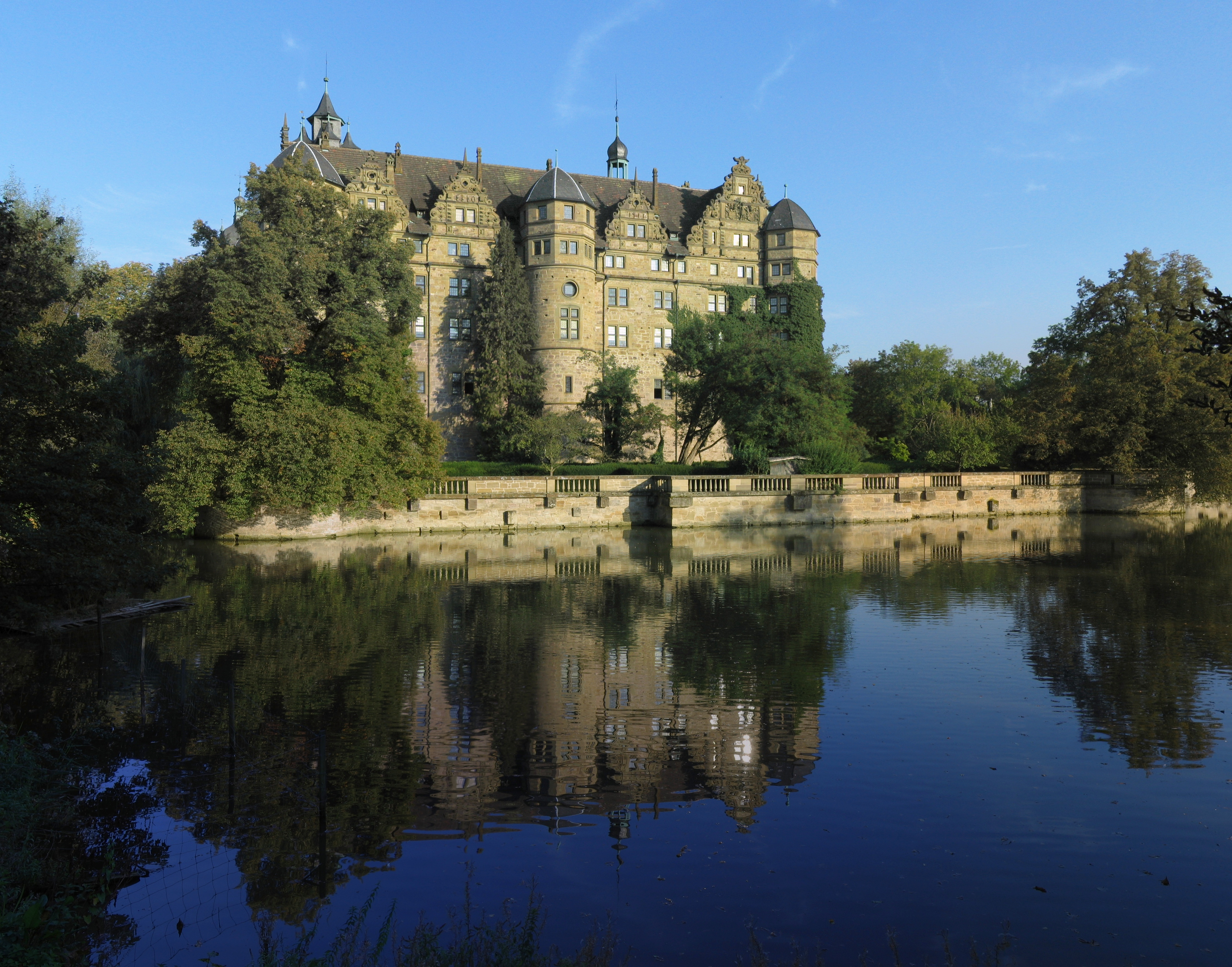
Neuenstein Castle

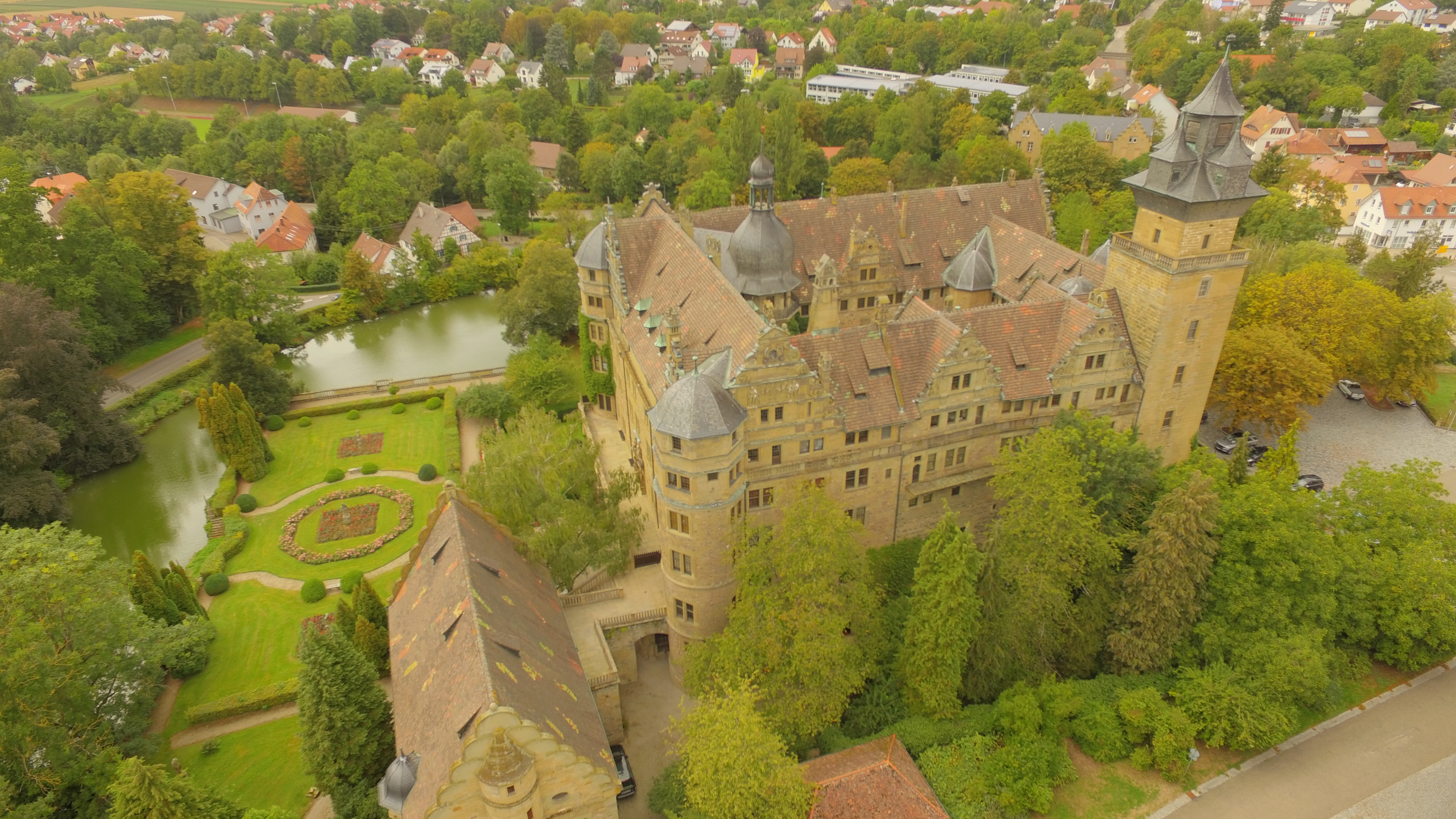
Neuenstein Castle, as seen from south-west

== Mayor ==
From 1999 to 2015 Sabine Eckert-Viereckel was the mayor. In February 2015 Karl Michael Nicklas was elected with 85% of the votes.

== Sons and daughters of the town ==
- Wendel Hipler (around 1465–1526), leader of the peasants in the German Peasants' War
- Wolfgang Julius, Count of Hohenlohe-Neuenstein (1622–1698), (Count of Hohenlohe-Neuenstein and imperial Generalfeldmarschall in the Turkish War
