= Johann Stumpf (writer) =

Swiss historian

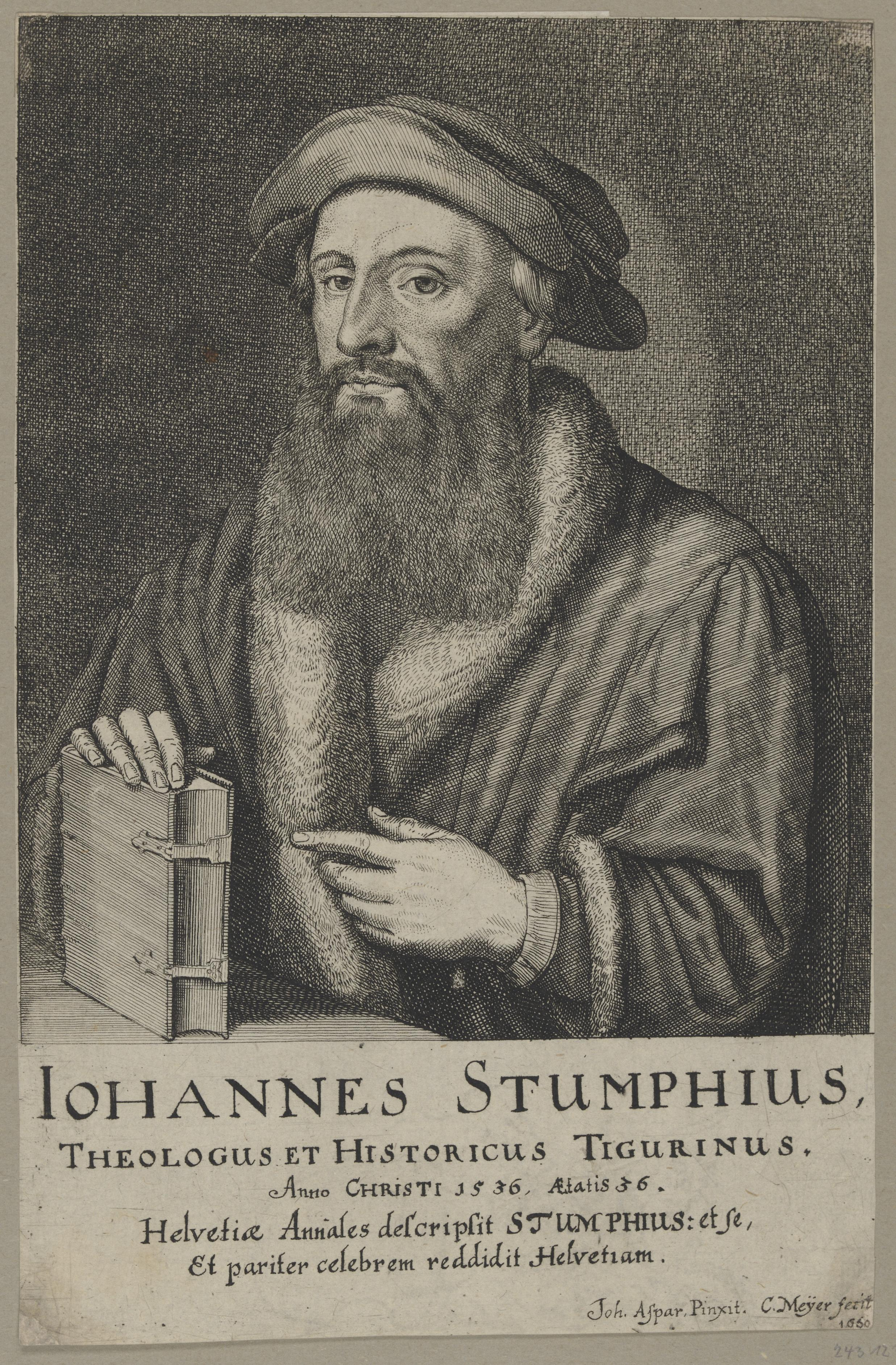
Johannes Stumpf (c. 1536)

Johann Stumpf (23 April 1500 – c. 1578) was an early writer on the history and topography of Switzerland as well as a theologian and cartographer.

== Biography ==
He was born at Bruchsal (near Karlsruhe), and was educated there and at Strasbourg and Heidelberg. In 1520 he became a cleric or chaplain in the order of the Knights Hospitaller. He was sent in 1521 to the preceptory of that order at Freiburg im Breisgau, ordained a priest at Basel, and in 1522 was placed in charge of the preceptory at Bubikon (north of Rapperswil (SG), in the canton of Zürich). However, Stumpf went over to the Protestants, was present at the Bern Disputation (1528), and took part in the First War of Kappel (1529).

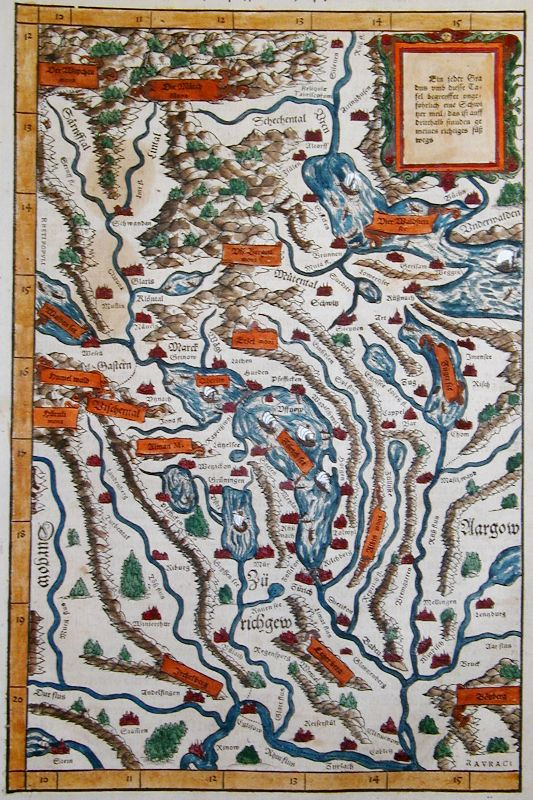
The Swiss region around Zürich.

In 1529 he married the first of his four wives, a daughter of Heinrich Brennwald, who wrote a work (still in manuscript) on Swiss history, and stimulated his son-in-law to undertake historical studies. Stumpf made wide researches, with this object, for many years, and undertook also several journeys, of which that in 1544 to Engelberg and through the Valais seems to be the most important, perhaps because his original diary has been preserved to us. The fruit of his labours (completed at the end of 1546) was published in 1548 at Zürich in a huge folio of 934 pages (with many fine wood engravings, coats of arms, maps, &c.), under the title of Gemeiner loblicher Eydgnoschafft Stetten, Landen und Voelckeren Chronick wirdiger thaaten Beschreybung. An extract from it was published in 1554, under the name of Schwytzer Chronika. New and greatly enlarged editions of the original work were issued in 1586 and 1606. The woodcuts are best in the first edition, and it remained till Scheuchzer's day (early 18th century) the chief authority on its subject.

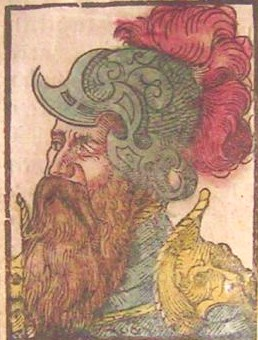
Swiss nobleman by Heinrich Vogtherr, Private Collection

When he converted to Protestantism, Stumpf had carried over with him most of his parishioners, whom he continued to care for, as the Protestant pastor at Bubikon, till 1543. He then became pastor of Stammheim (today Oberstammheim and Unterstammheim) until 1561, when he retired to Zürich (of which he had been made a burgher in 1548), where he lived in retirement till his death in 1576.

Stumpf also published a monograph (very remarkable for the date) about Henry III, Holy Roman Emperor (1556) and a set of laudatory verses (German: Lobsprüche) about each of the thirteen Swiss cantons.

== Gallery ==
The battle of Morat, part of an engraving from the Stumpf Chronik

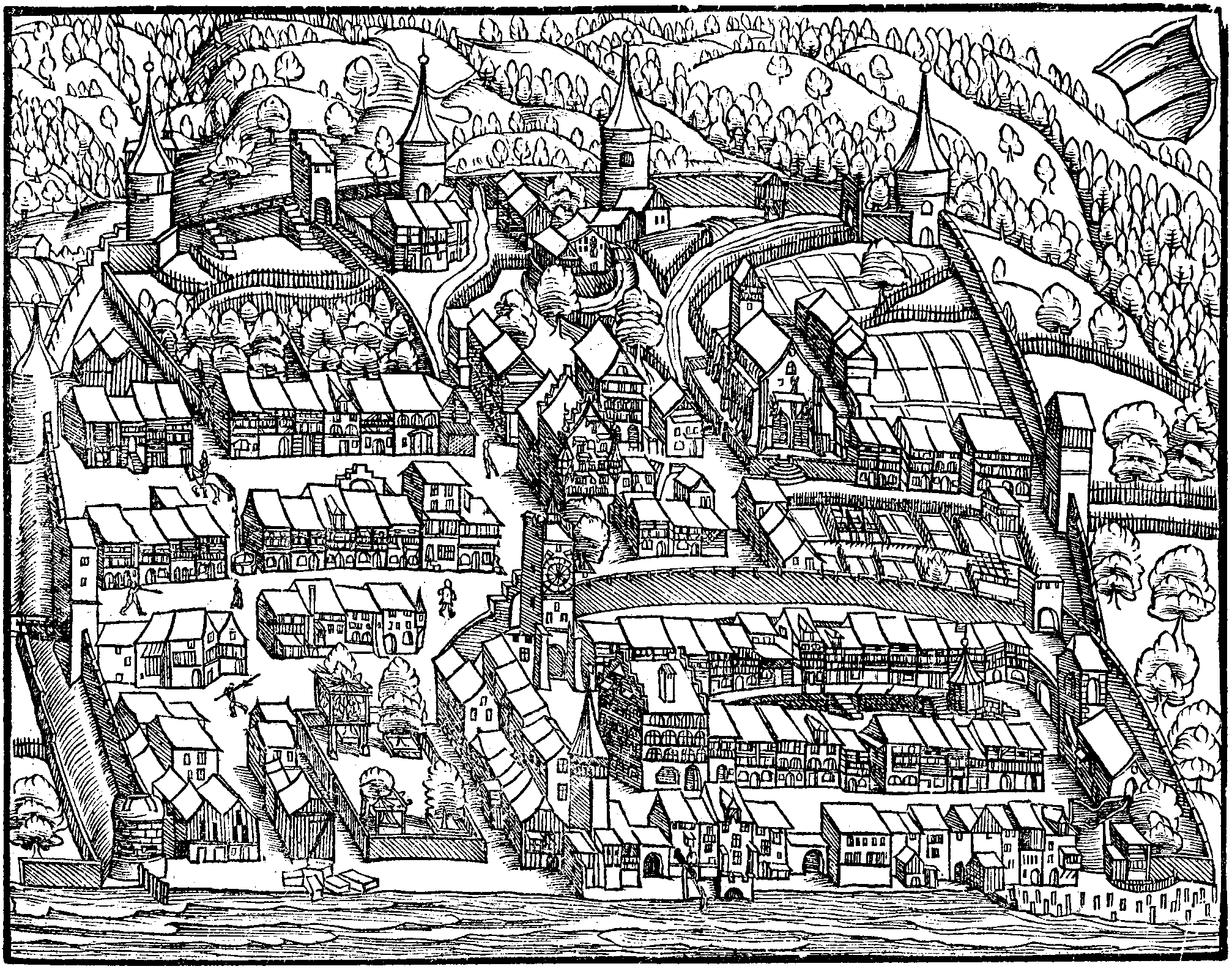
The Swiss town of Zug

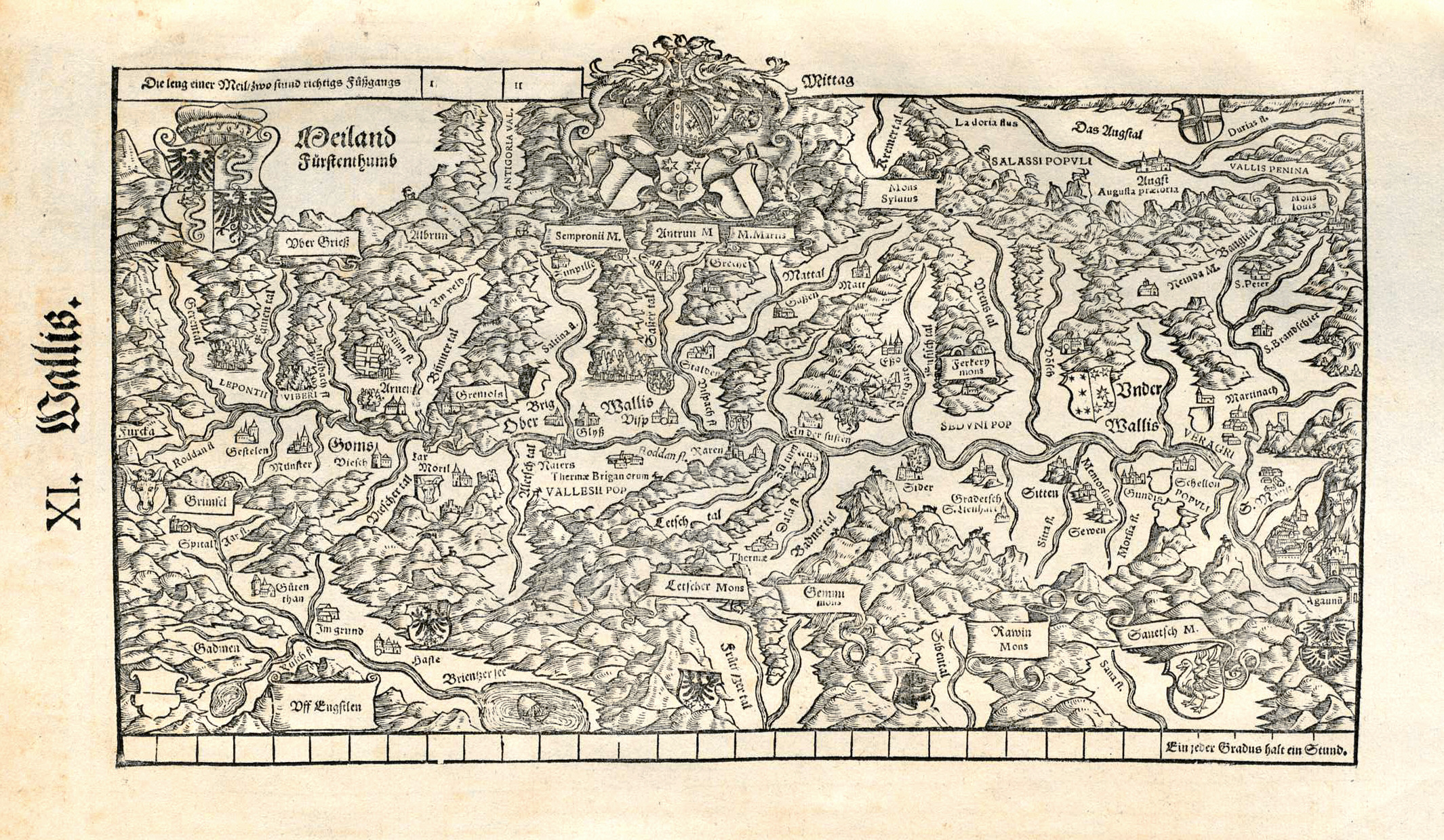
The Canton Valais in Landtaflen.

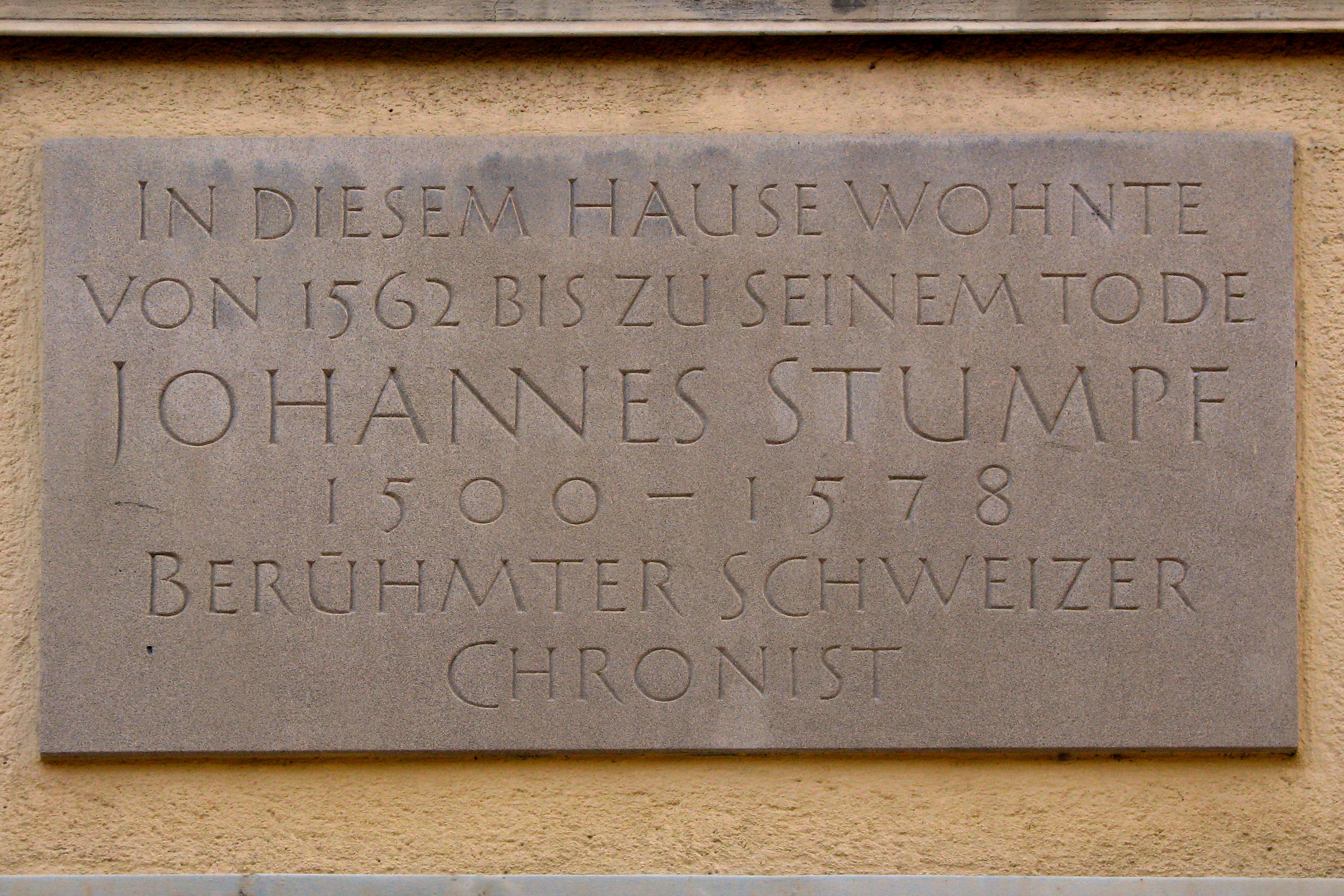
Memorial, Trittligasse Zürich
