= Waldenburg, Baden-Württemberg =

Waldenburg
- Town
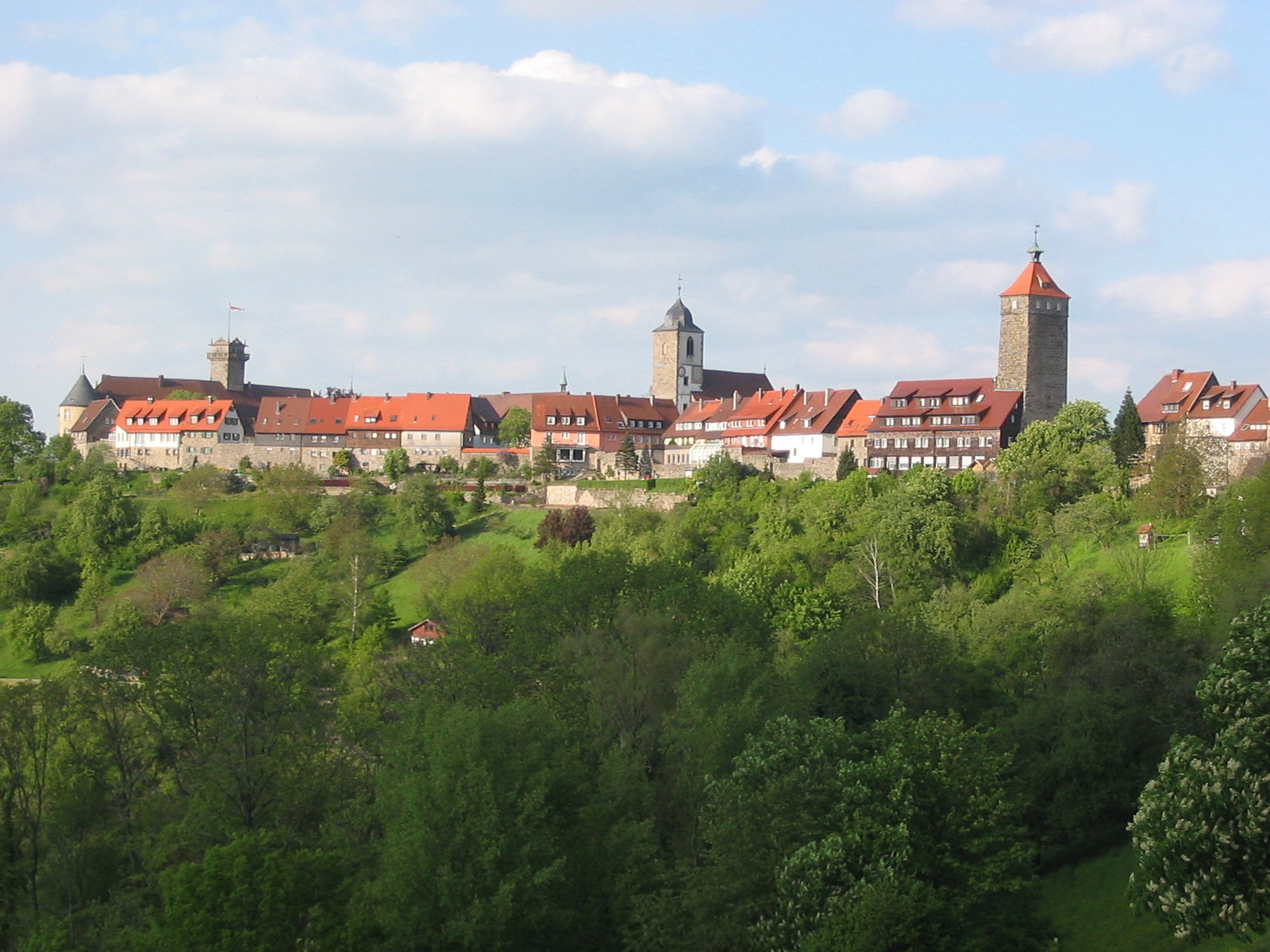
- Waldenburg

- Coat of arms

- Location of Waldenburg within Hohenlohekreis district
- Interactive map of Waldenburg
- Location within Germany Location within Baden-Württemberg
- Coordinates: 49°11′N 9°38′E
- Country: Germany
- State: Baden-Württemberg
- Admin. region: Stuttgart
- District: Hohenlohekreis
- Municipal assoc.: Hohenloher Ebene
- Subdivisions: 3

Government
  - Mayor (2020–28): Bernd Herzog

Area
  - Total: 31.55 km^{2} (12.18 sq mi)
- Elevation: 506 m (1,660 ft)

Population (2025-12-31)
  - Total: 2,987
  - Density: 94.68/km^{2} (245.2/sq mi)
- Time zone: UTC+01:00 (CET)
  - Summer (DST): UTC+02:00 (CEST)
- Postal codes: 74638
- Dialling codes: 07942
- Vehicle registration: KÜN, ÖHR
- Website: www.waldenburg-hohenlohe.de

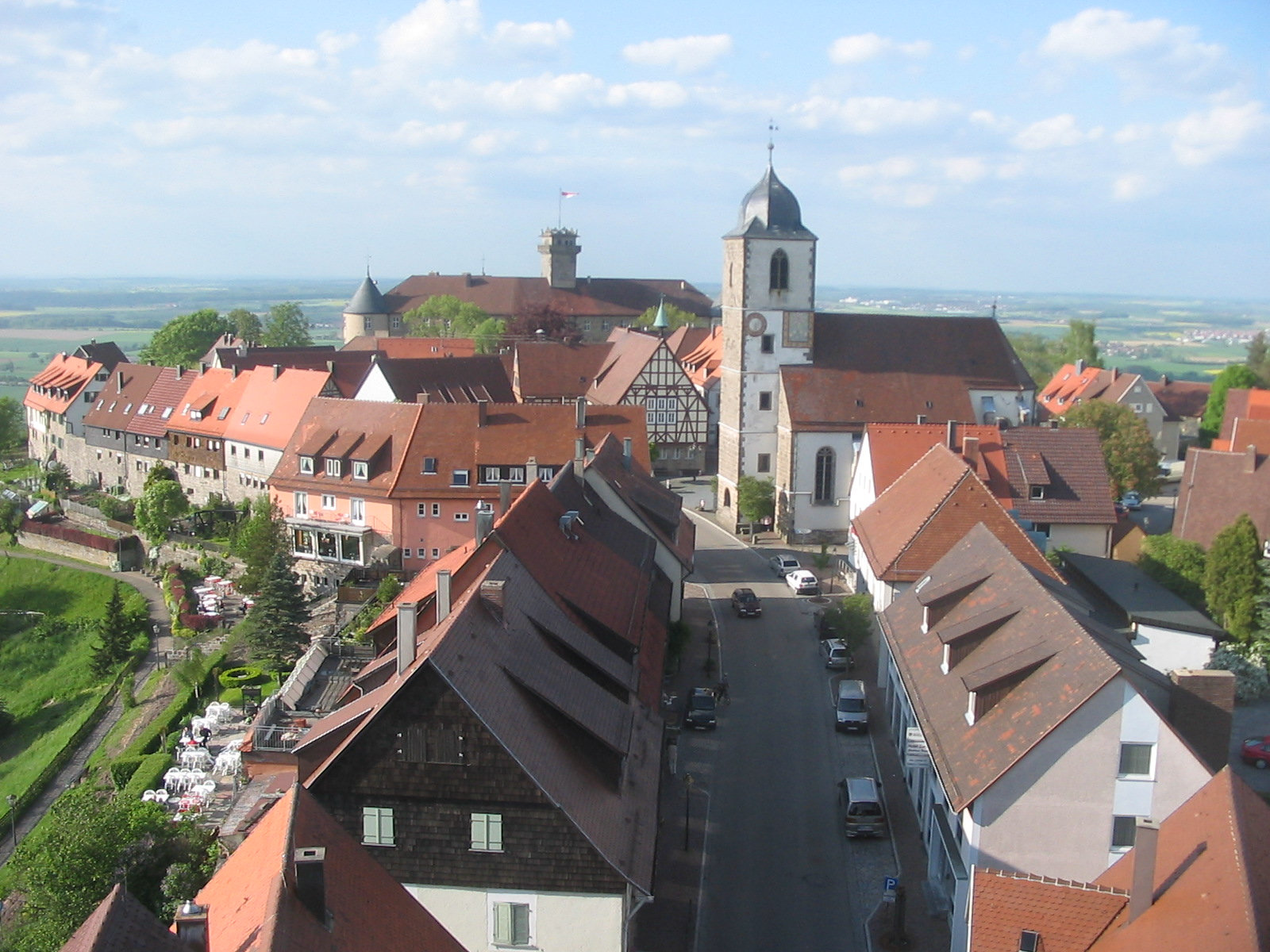
View from the Bergfried

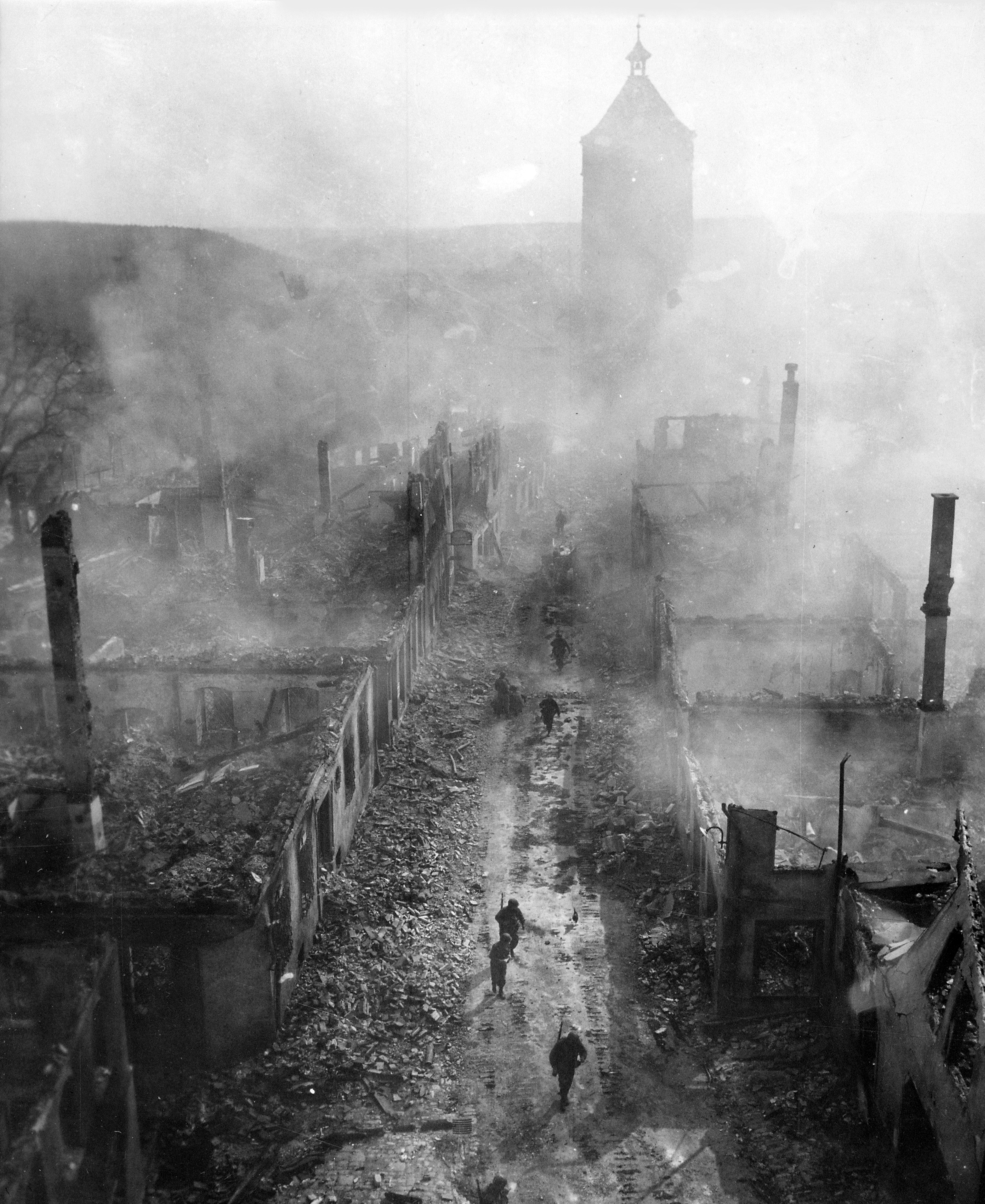
Waldenburg on 16 April 1945

Waldenburg (German pronunciation: [ˈvaldn̩bʊʁk]) is a hilltop town in south central Germany, eastwards of Heilbronn in the Hohenlohe (district) of Baden-Württemberg. The town is the site of Waldenburg Castle and some hilltop churches. Records first mention Waldenburg in the year 1253, but the town was destroyed in April 1945, at the end of World War II, and it has been rebuilt since.

== Geography ==
=== Geographical form ===
Waldenburg covers part of the natural Schwäbisch-Fränkische forest-hills and the Hohenloher-Haller Ebene.

=== City outline ===
Waldenburg includes the village of Waldenburg proper and the 2 sections Obersteinbach (173 people, as of 31 March 2006) and Sailach (222 people).

== History ==
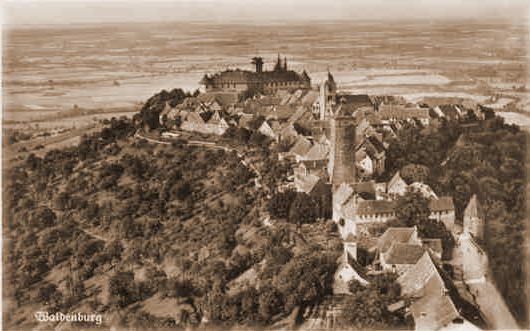
Waldenburg in 1930

The first recorded mention of Waldenburg dates from 1253. By 1330 it was a free imperial city in the Holy Roman Empire. Plague and war reduced the population during the Thirty Years' War. The Confederation of the Rhine of 1806 annexed Waldenburg into the Kingdom of Württemberg under the process of "mediatisation", and the town has been part of the state of Baden-Württemberg, within the Federal Republic of Germany, since 1952.

In April 1945, at the end of World War II, the town was occupied for a last-ditch stand by the Wehrmacht against the advancing Third United States Army, and was almost completely destroyed by American artillery. Postwar efforts have reconstructed some historic buildings.

The ancient castle still belongs to the Hohenlohe-Waldenburg-Schillingsfürst family that built it.

On 1 January 1971, there was the annexation of Upper Steinbach.

=== Religions ===
In Waldenburg, there are Protestant, Catholic and Apostolic churches. The Catholic Church, together with the parishes of Pfedelbach and Bretzfeld form a pastoral unit.

=== Population growth ===
Estimated population of Waldenburg, per year:

- 1648: 640
- 2000: 3079
- 2005: 3083

== Politics ==
=== Mayors ===
- Franz Gehweiler (November 1945–March 1978)
- Gerhard Lauth (March 1978–August 1990)
- Roland Weinschenk (December 1990–April 2004)
- Markus Knobel (July 2004 – 2020)
- Bernd Herzog (since 2020)

=== Coat of arms and flag ===
The blazon of arms of Waldenburg is: in the upper part of gold with green ground, are three green fir trees; below in a silver border, is a red-tongued black lion (leopard), with tail curled underneath. The flag of the city is red and white.

From the 16th Century since, the seals in the Waldenburg detectable crest reaches into the upper half of the city name, and displays in the bottom half with the leopard, the emblem of Hohenlohe. The city colors are the colors of the Hohenlohe house.

=== Sister cities ===
Waldenburg maintains partnership relations with Sierck-les-Bains in Lorraine, France.

== Economy and infrastructure ==
=== Traffic ===
Waldenburg is located on autobahn A 6 and federal highway B 19.

Waldenburg is located in the area of HNV on the Heilbronn–Crailsheim railway. Waldenburg (Wurttemberg) station is served every two hours by Regional-Express services to Heilbronn and Crailsheim. In the hours in between Regional-Express services it is served by Regionalbahn services on the Öhringen–Schwäbisch Hall-Hessental route.

=== Established companies ===
The industrial park is a plan of the Hohenlohe Waldenburg Association of Municipalities, copper and cell Künzelsau and has an area of 230 hectares (570 acres), of which 135 hectares are being used. It is situated at the foot of the mountain Waldenburg 6 in the immediate vicinity of the station Waldenburg, the Federal Autobahn and Federal Street 19.

In the industrial field, the following companies are based or have a production site:

- R. Stahl
- Ziehl-Abegg
- SWG (Schraubenwerk Gaisbach) of the Würth Group
- Lidl
- Wolff & Müller
- Würth Elektronik eiSos, part of the Würth Elektronik Group

== Culture and sights ==
=== Museums ===
The City Council of Waldenburg is a museum with Urweltfunden. Since 1971, the castle houses a museum with collections of seals from the early Middle Ages.

=== Buildings and structures ===
- Schloss Waldenburg
- Keep
- Remnants of the monastery at the settlement site Goldbach
- Waldenburg TV Tower
- Friedrichsberg Television Tower, a TV tower of reinforced concrete under construction
- Evangelical Lutheran, Catholic, and Apostolic churches exist in Waldenburg.

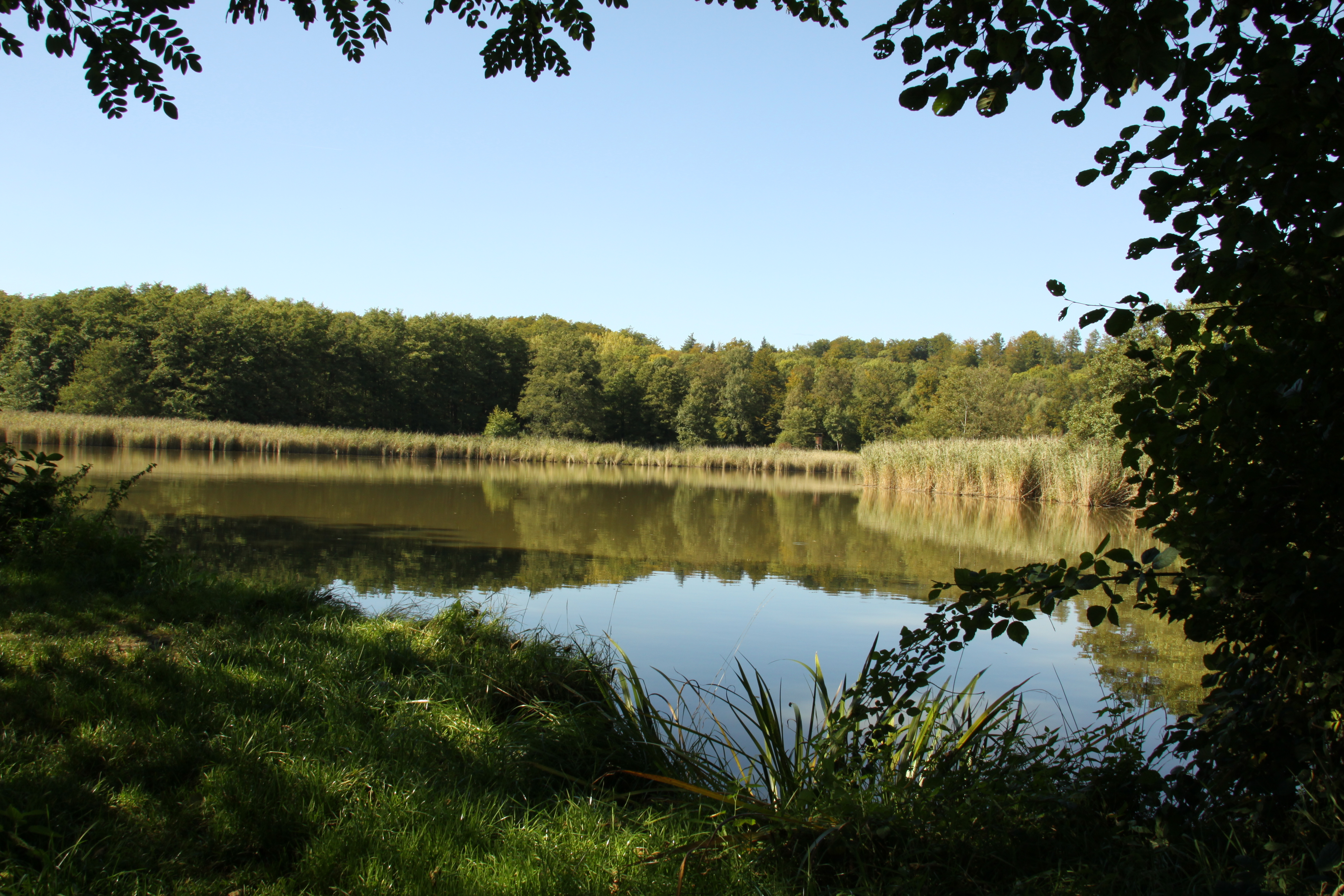
The Rößlesmahdsee lake nature reserve

East of Waldburg operates the southwest radio with the 150-metre-high (490 ft) TV Tower Waldenburg-Fredericksburg since 2008, as the main transmitter for radio and television. By 2009, the village was finished using TV Tower Waldenburg in operation, which was dismantled after the shutdown to the water tower.

=== Nature ===
Near the settlement site Goldbach are the nature reserves of Rößlesmahdsee, with Pfaffenklinge and the Eastern Goldbachsee lake.

Between Obersteinbach and the hamlet of Tommelhardt are the nature reserves of Obere Weide (pasture) and Entlesboden, which show the natural vegetation of the old Hutewälder forest.

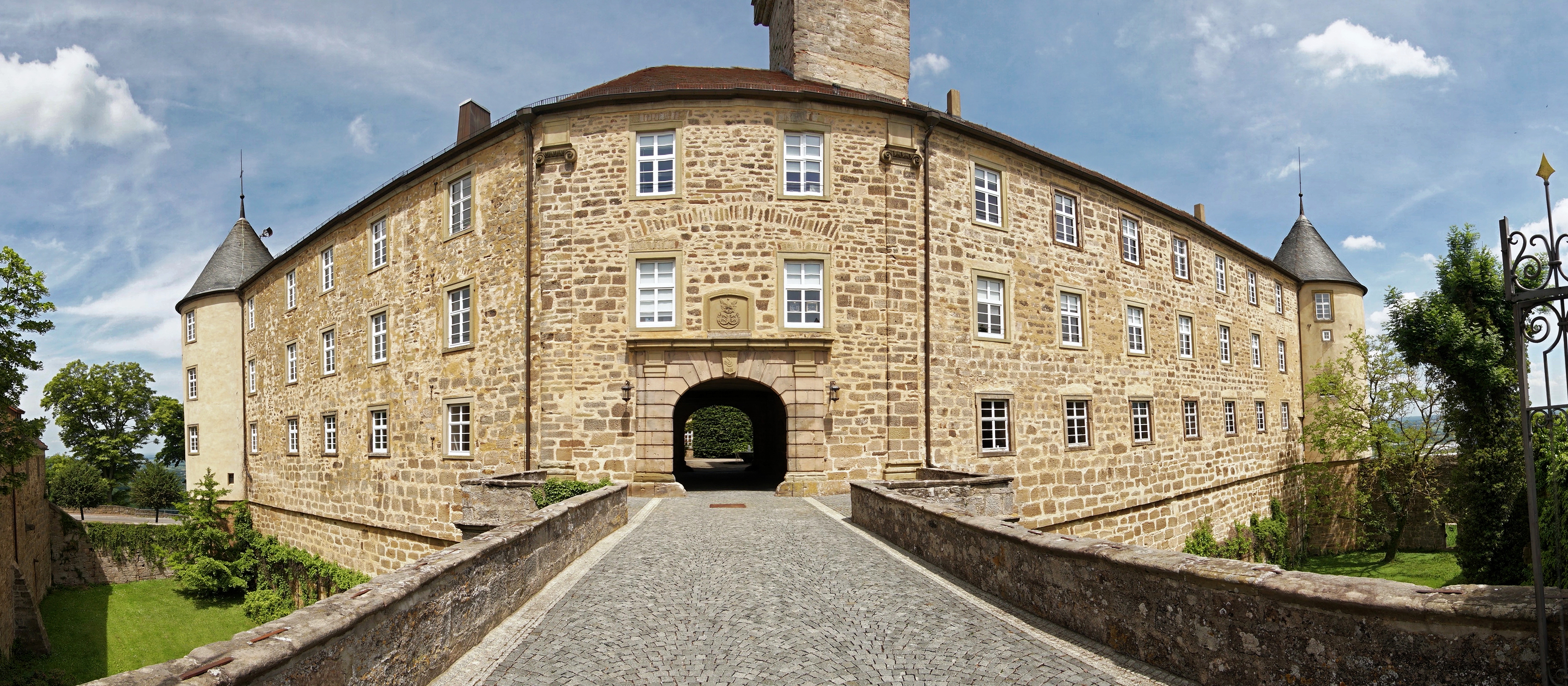
Castle

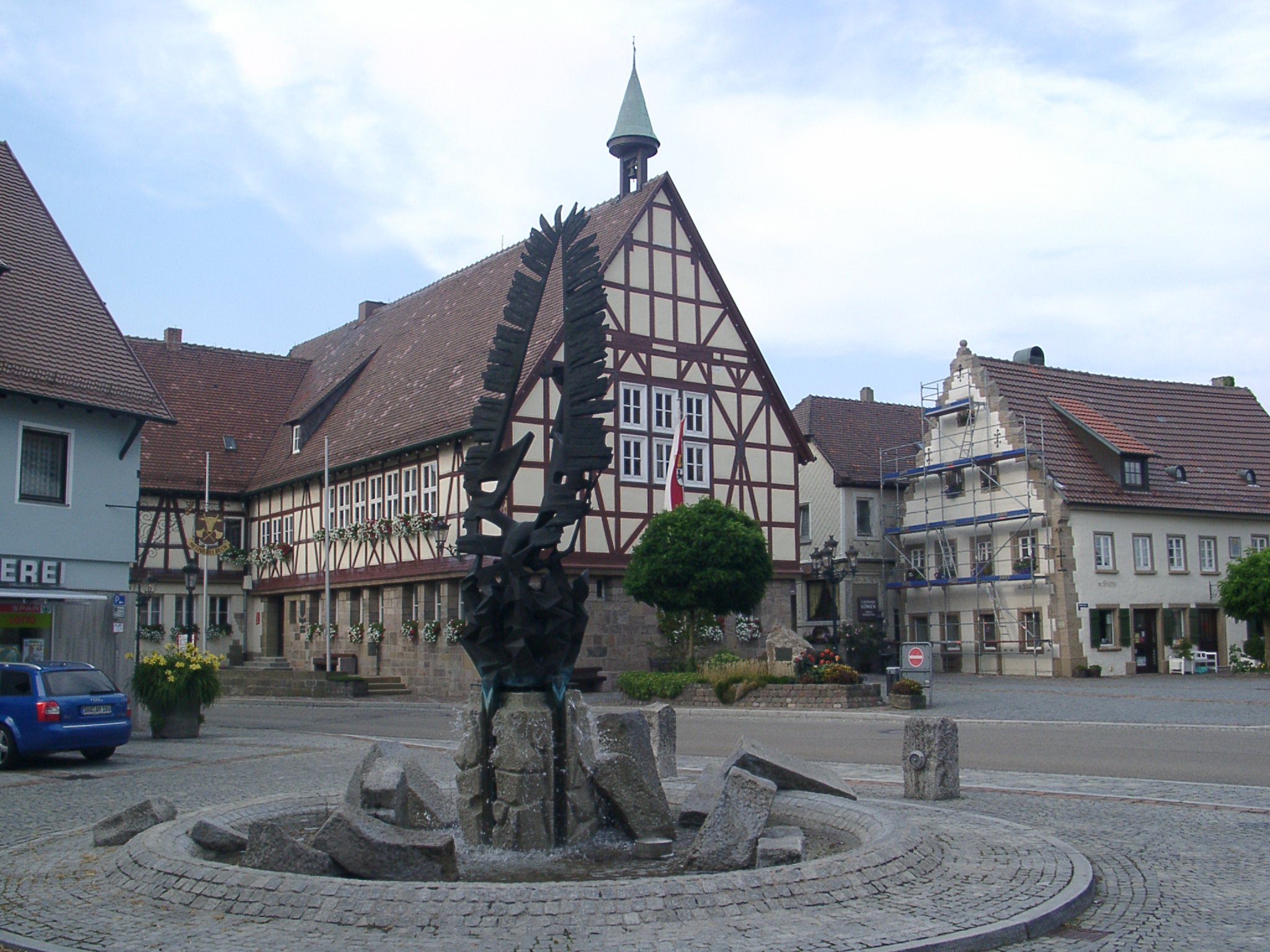
Town Hall

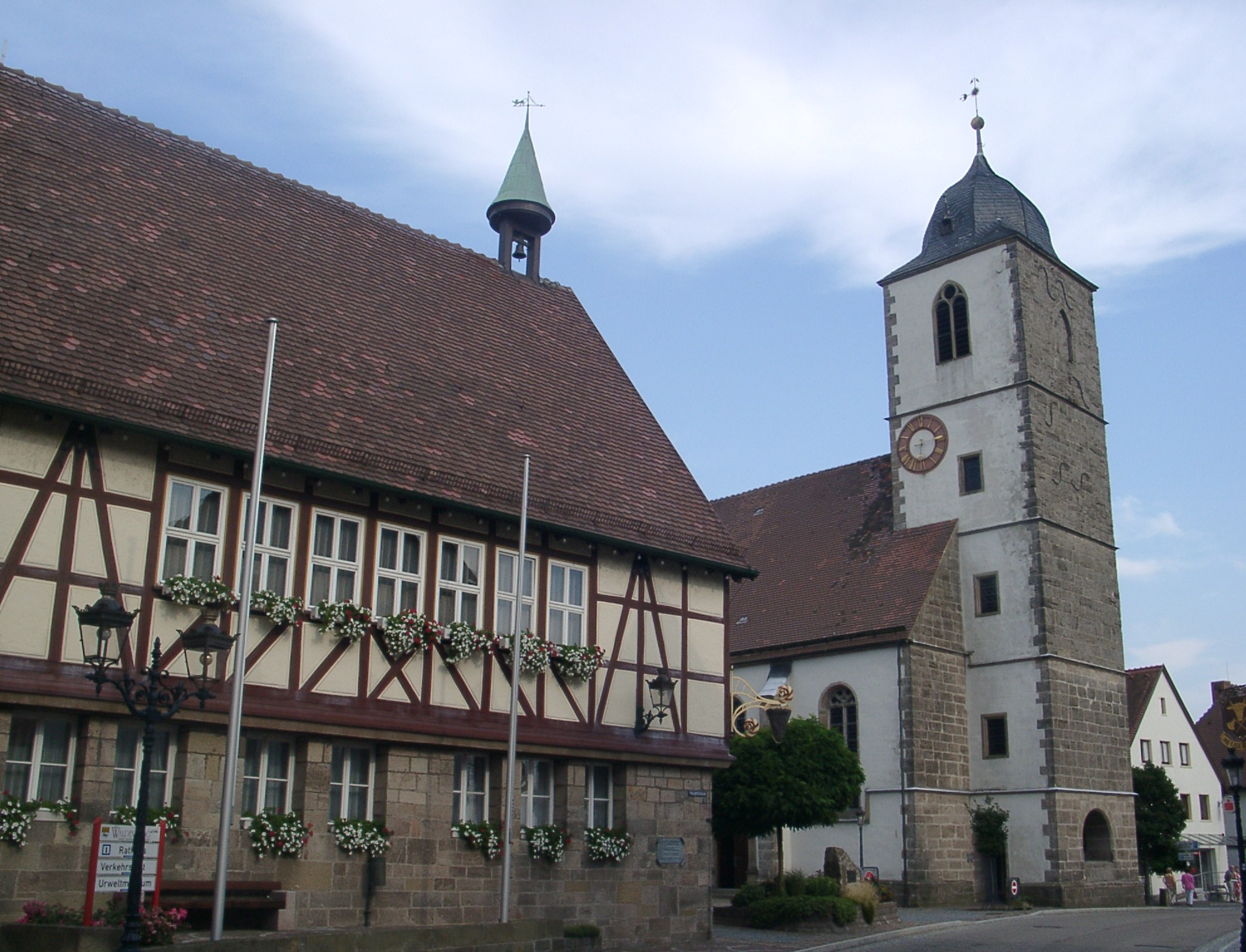
Church

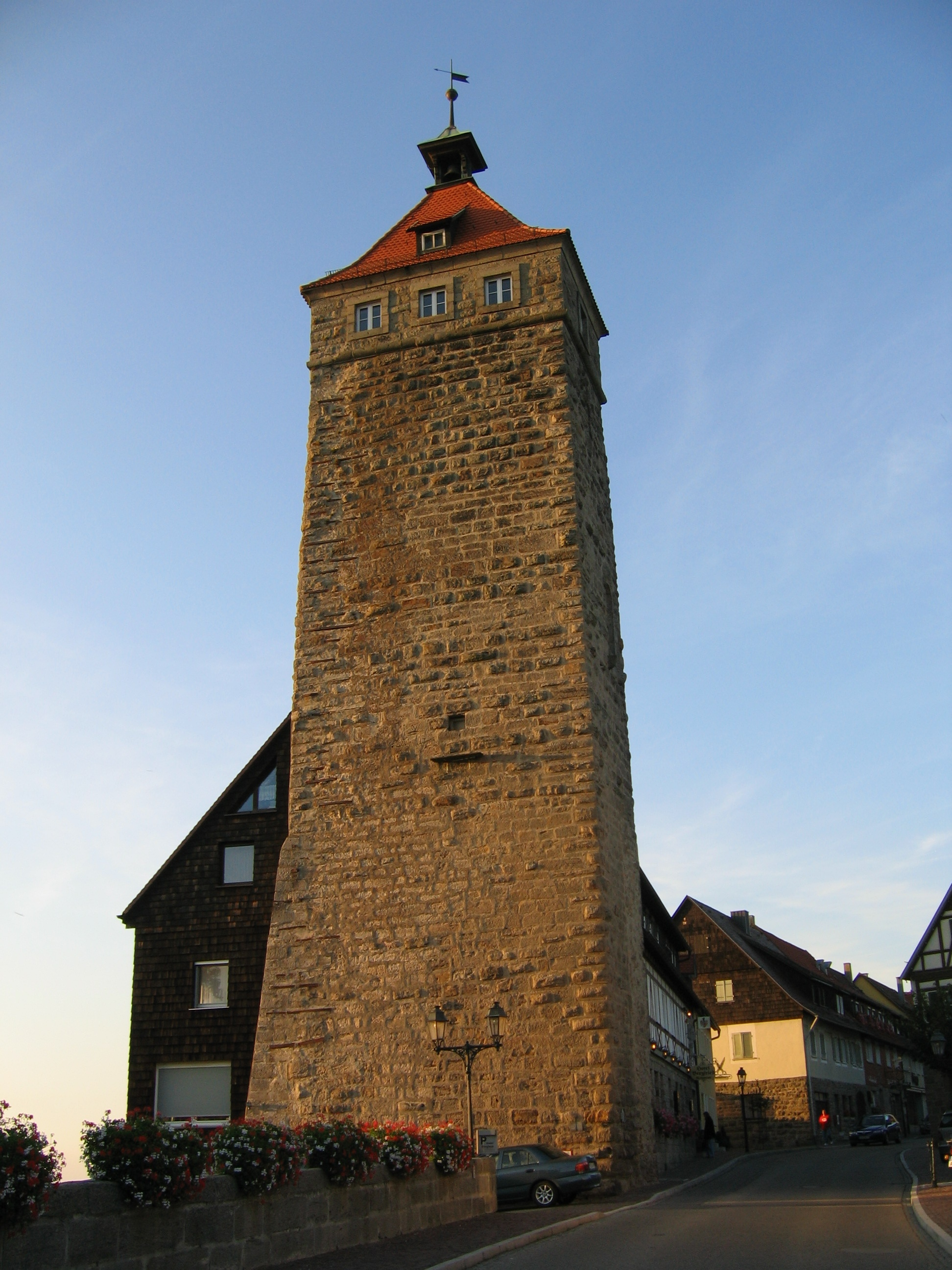
Lachners tower
