= Wendel Hipler =

Wendel Hipler (Neuenstein, c. 1465 – Heidelberg, 1526) was a German nobleman and revolutionary. Despite his own elite background, Hipler sided with the insurgents during the peasant uprising in Franconia in 1525. Alongside Florian Geyer, he was among a minority of noblemen to remain committed to the peasants' cause.

Hipler was the primary author of the "Heilbronn Manifesto", which was considered by Marxist theorists such as Friedrich Engels to be the "nearest approximation to a bourgeois revolutionary programme" to exist during the Peasants' War. However, the Heilbronn programme was also less radical than the vision of some of the peasant troops, trying to find a compromise between rebels and lords. Its most radical component lay in the intention to deprive monasteries of their sovereign powers. At the same time, it made important concessions to the nobility as it "intended to use ecclesiastical lands to reimburse them for their losses of tithe income, indirect taxes, and transfer fines." Hipler died in Heidelberg in 1526.
