= Hohenlohe-Waldenburg-Schillingsfürst =

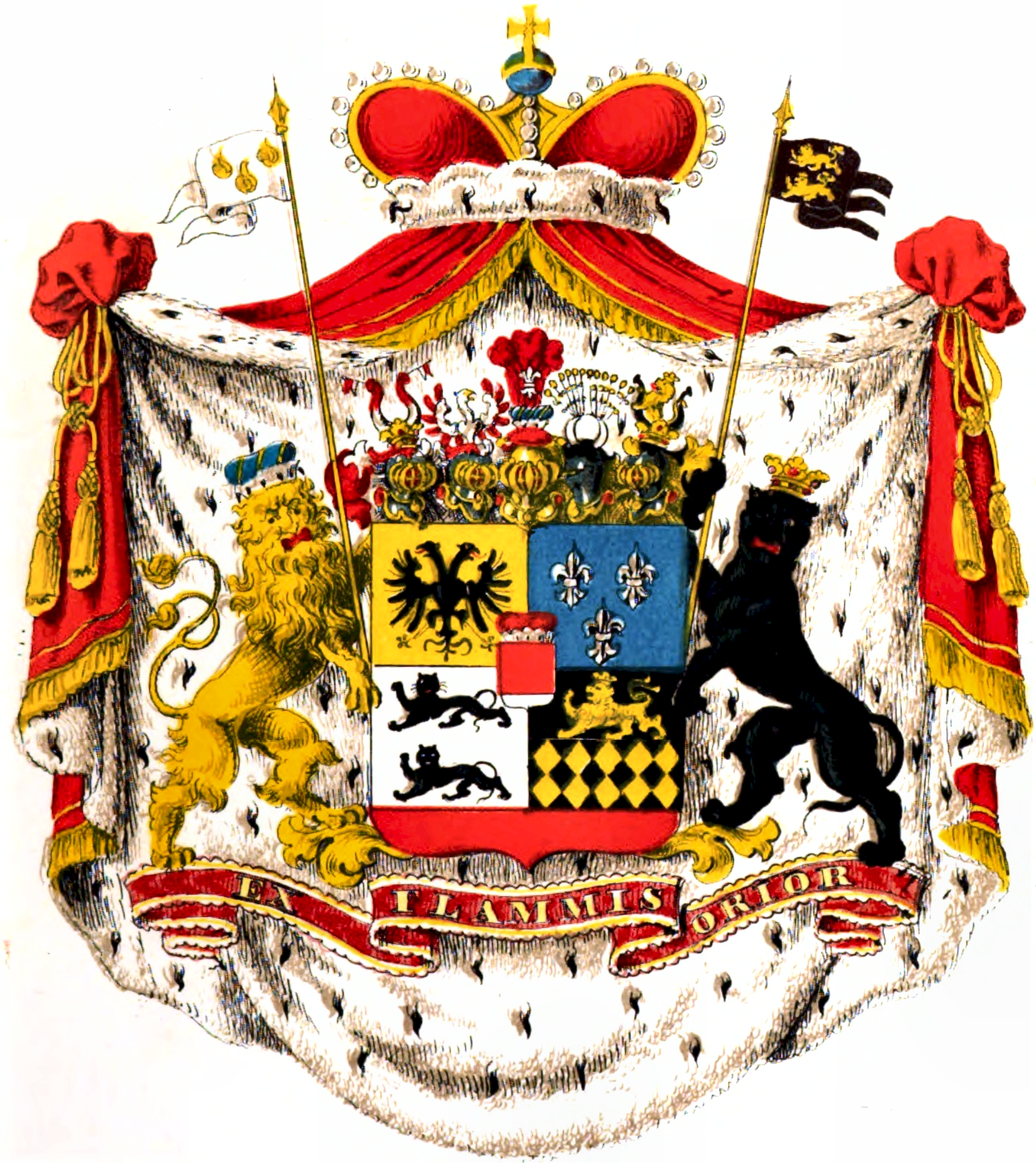
Coat of arms of the Princes of Hohenlohe-Waldenburg-Schillingsfürst

Hohenlohe-Waldenburg-Schillingsfürst was a County, and later Principality in northeastern Baden-Württemberg, Germany. The name Hohenlohe derives from the castle of Hohenloch near Uffenheim in Mittelfranken, which came into the possession of the descendants of Conrad of Weikersheim by 1178.

== History ==
Waldenburg-Schillingsfürst was partitioned from the lands held by the descendants of Kraft von Hohenlohe, who was made an Imperial count in 1450. The Hohenlohe territories were divided between the brothers Count Ludwig Kasimir (1517-1568) (of the senior Neuenstein line, progenitors of the Hohenlohe-Langenburg and Hohenlohe-Oehringen branches) and Count Eberhard (1535-1570), founder of the various Hohenlohe-Waldenburg branches.

The Schillingsfürst line descends from Count Ludwig Gustav (1634-1697), whose descendant Philip Ernest obtained the erection of his fiefs into a principality within the Holy Roman Empire, enjoying Imperial immediacy, in 1744. The county of Waldenburg was added to the principality in 1757. It was mediatised to the Kingdom of Württemberg in 1806.

Three branches are extant – those of Waldenburg, Ratibor und Corvey, and Schillingsfürst. The members of the house bear the style of "Prince/Princess of Hohenlohe-Waldenburg-Schillingsfürst" or "Prince/Princess von Ratibor und Corvey, Prince/Princess of Hohenlohe-Schillingsfürst" or "Prince/Princess of Hohenlohe-Schillingsfürst, von Ratibor und Corvey" or "Prince/Princess von Ratibor und Corvey" or "Prince/Princess of Hohenlohe-Waldenburg-Schillingsfürst, von Ratibor und Corvey", depending upon which of the four sub-lines of the Waldenburg-Schillingsfürst branch they belong to.

== Counts (1688–1744) ==
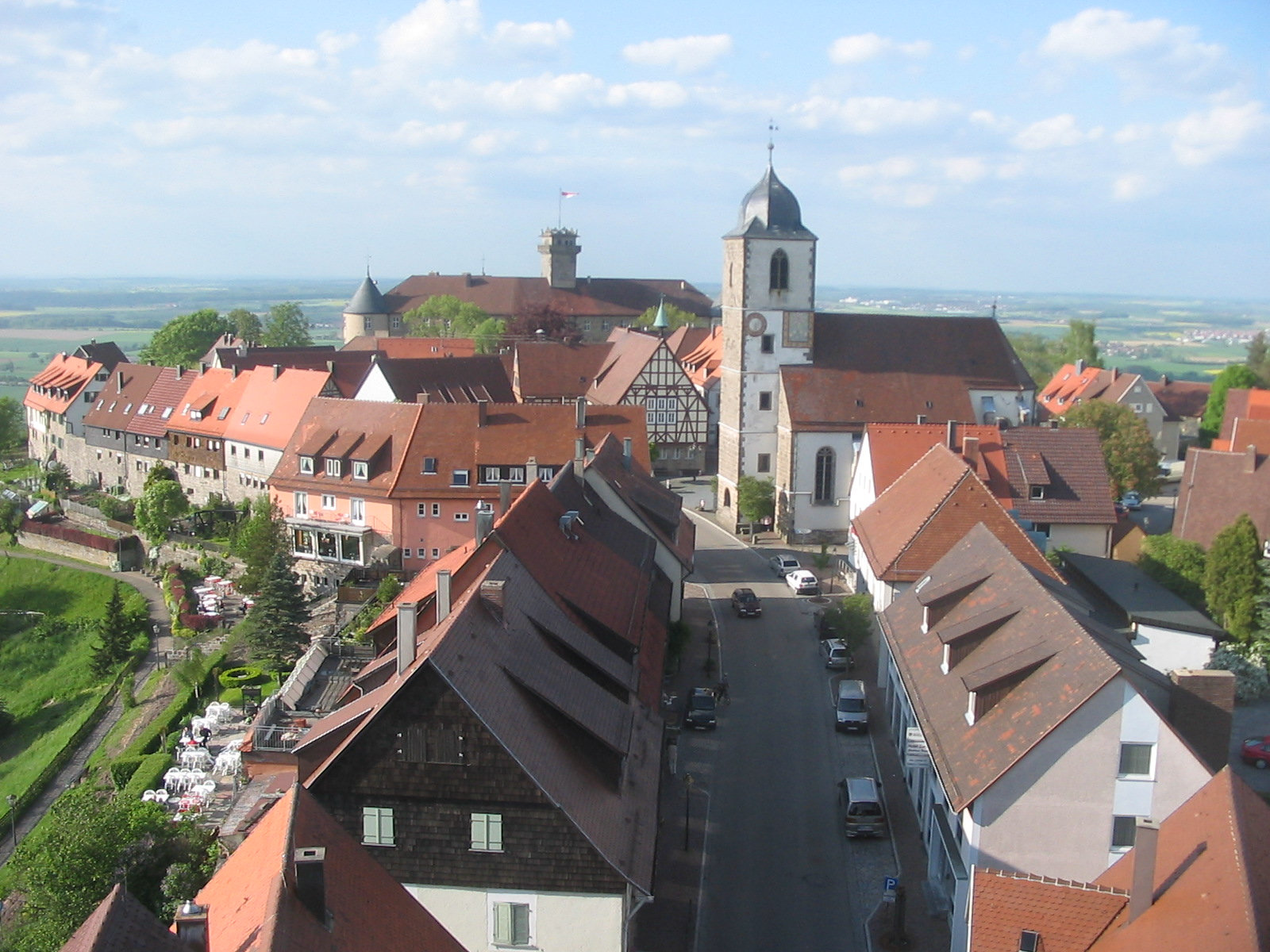
Waldenburg town and castle

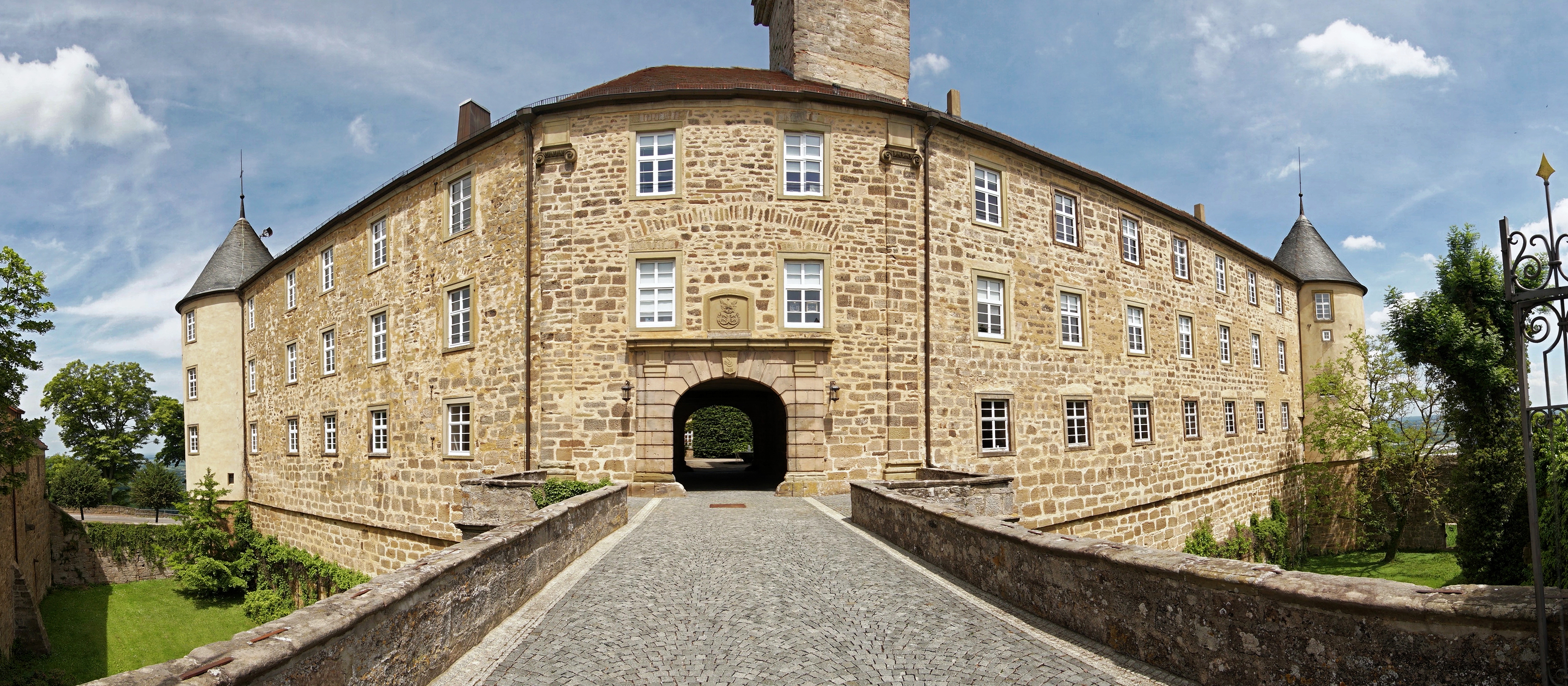
Schloss Waldenburg

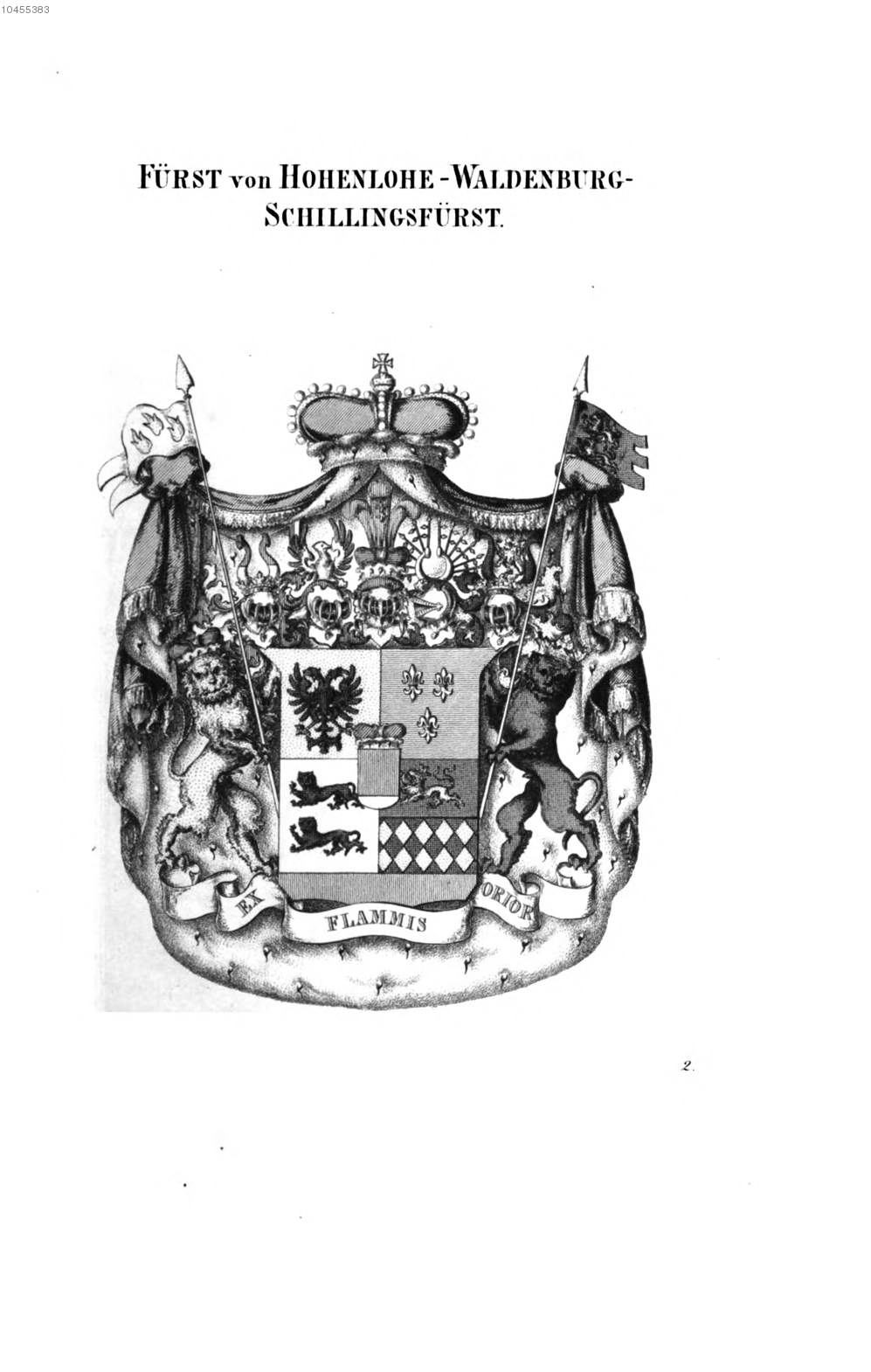
Antique print of the princely arms

- Ludwig Gustav 1688-1697
- Philip Ernest 1697-1744 (became 1st Prince of Hohenlohe-Waldenburg-Schillingsfürst)

== Princes (1744–present) ==
The following are the princes from 1744 until the present:

- Philip Ernest, 1st Prince of Hohenlohe-Waldenburg-Schillingsfürst 1744-1750 (1663-1759)
  - Charles Albert I, 2nd Prince of Hohenlohe-Waldenburg-Schillingsfürst 1750-1793 (1719-1793)
    - Charles Albert II, 3rd Prince of Hohenlohe-Waldenburg-Schillingsfürst 1793–1796 (1742-1796)
      - Charles Albert III, 4th Prince of Hohenlohe-Waldenburg-Schillingsfürst 1796–1843 (1776-1843)
        - Friedrich Karl I, 5th Prince of Hohenlohe-Waldenburg-Schillingsfürst 1843-1884 (1814-1884)
          - Nikolaus, 6th Prince of Hohenlohe-Waldenburg-Schillingsfürst 1884–1886 (1841-1886)
          - Friedrich Karl II, 7th Prince of Hohenlohe-Waldenburg-Schillingsfürst 1886–1924 (1846-1924)
            - Friedrich Karl III, 8th Prince of Hohenlohe-Waldenburg-Schillingsfürst 1924-1982 (1908-1982)
              - Friedrich Karl IV, 9th Prince of Hohenlohe-Waldenburg-Schillingsfürst 1982–2017 (1933-2017)
              - Hubertus zu Hohenlohe-Waldenburg-Schillingsfürst (1935-2021)
                - Felix zu Hohenlohe-Waldenburg-Schillingsfürst, 10th Prince of Hohenlohe-Waldenburg-Schillingsfürst 2017–present (b. 1963)
                  - Prince Konrad zu Hohenlohe-Waldenburg-Schillingsfürst (b. 1995) heir presumptive
                  - Prince Albrecht zu Hohenlohe-Waldenburg-Schillingsfürst (b. 2002)
                - Prince Franz zu Hohenlohe-Waldenburg-Schillingsfürst (b. 1965)
                - Prince Maximilian zu Hohenlohe-Waldenburg-Schillingsfürst (b. 1967)
      - Prince Alexander of Hohenlohe-Waldenburg-Schillingsfürst (1794-1849)
      - Franz Joseph, 1st Prince of Hohenlohe-Schillingsfürst (1787-1841), founder of the Ratibor and Corvey lines

== See also ==
- Hohenlohe
- Waldenburg, Baden-Württemberg
