= Friedrich Oberschelp =

German teacher and choir director

- Born: 1895
- Died: 1986 (aged 90–91)
- Occupations: Teacher; Choral conductor
- Organization: Bielefelder Kinderchor
- Children: Jürgen Oberschelp
- Awards: Leineweber-Medaille

Friedrich Oberschelp (1895–1986) was a German music teacher and choral conductor. He founded the Bielefelder Kinderchor, a mixed children's choir in Bielefeld, in 1932 and led it until 1984, making recordings and touring internationally. He also founded Die Leineweber, a mixed choir formed by former members of the children's choir, in 1946, with a focus on German Volkslied. The children's choir became famous for its Christmas concerts and was internationally recognised.

== Life and career ==
Oberschelp was a teacher at the Fröbelschule elementary school in Bielefeld, and later rector of the KuhloSchule there. He founded the Bielefelder Kinderchor, a mixed children's choir, in 1932. It was the first mixed children's choir in Germany. He led the choir in first rehearsals at the school's Turnhalle (gymnasium). He recruited singers, from age 10, by visiting the fourth grades of elementary schools before summer vacation, and listening to voices. He went on to conduct the choir in concerts, many recordings and international tours. Under the Nazi regime, the choir had to join the Hitlerjugend. In 1942, they spent four weeks in Salzburg for concerts.

After World War II, Oberschelp also founded a mixed choir of young adults in 1946, focused on German Volkslied. The members were all former members of the children's choir. The group first had no name, and held rehearsals at the Fröbelschule. He realised soon that working for two choirs was too much, and passed conducting to Fritz Reinardt. The choir was then called Die Leineweber.

The Bielefelder Kinderchor became famous for Weihnachtskonzerte (Christmas concerts) conducted by Oberschelp before Christmas at the Rudolf-Oetker-Halle. Sometimes up to 14 Christmas concerts were held in one season for sold-out halls.

From 1950, a house was built for the choir at today's Furtwänglerstraße 14, designed by the town's Baurat (building adviser), Kirchner. Parents of singers helped actively and by donations. The 1951 statutes focused on the vocal musical education of the youth to cultivate German song. The choir focused on German Volkslied and songs of German romanticism. Tours took the singers first to the Ruhr and Rhine, later to Hungary, Japan and the U.S..

Oberschelp was the conductor until 1984. He was then succeeded by his son Jürgen Oberschelp, who had been a choir member.

Oberschelp died in 1986.

== Recordings ==
Recordings of the Bielefelder Kinderchor conducted by Oberschelp were advertised internationally, such as in the English trade magazine Record Mail in April 1959, mentioning Mendelssohn's "Hebe deine Augen auf" and Weber's "Wir winden dir den Jungfernkranz", among others. They recorded an album of Christmas carols in 1961, beginning with "Vom Himmel hoch". They recorded sacred music, titled Ave Maria - Agnus Dei, with tenor Rudolf Schock and the Nordwestdeutsche Philharmonie conducted by Wilhelm Schüchter in 1964. They recorded another album of carols named Alle Jahre wieder, and an album of German Volkslieder. Their 1979 single of the Christmas carol "Am Weihnachtsbaume die Lichter brennen" made the German charts. They made a recording of mostly Volkslieder, Das große Jubiläumskonzert, on the occasion of the 50th anniversary in 1982, released by Ariola-Eurodisc, Gütersloh / Munich.

== Awards ==
In 1985, he was the first recipient of the Leineweber-Medaille, given by the Verkehrsverein Bielefeld (Tourist information office) to citizens who increased the reputation of Bielefeld by exemplary engagement.
