= Eschenstruth =

Locality in Germany

- Village
- Interactive map of Eschenstruth
- Coordinates: 51°14′N 9°40′E
- Country: Germany
- State: Hesse
- District: Kassel
- Municipality: Helsa

Area
  - Total: 8.09 km^{2} (3.12 sq mi)
- Elevation: 347 m (1,138 ft)

Population (2022)
  - Total: 1,656
- Postal code: 34298
- Area code: 05602

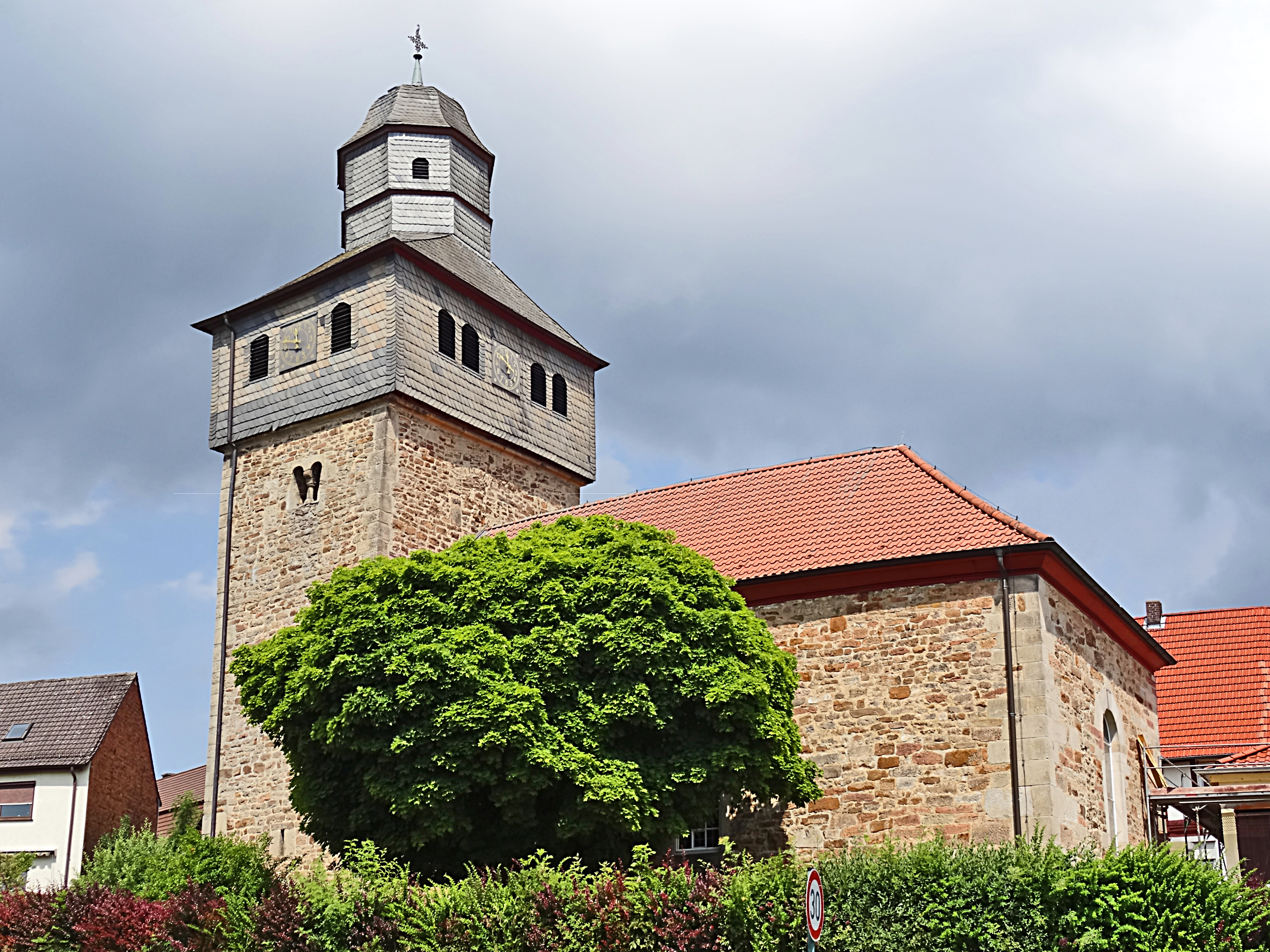
Evangelical St. Thomas Church

Eschenstruth is one of the four localities of the municipality of Helsa in the northern Hessian district of Kassel. As of the 2022 census, Eschenstruth had a population of 1,656.

== Geography ==
Eschenstruth is situated on the eastern slope of the wooded area known as the Söhre (part of the Stiftswald Kaufungen) southeast of the Kleiner Belgerkopf (approximately 490 m above sea level). The village is located about 3.6 km (as the crow flies) south-southwest of the core of Helsa. To the south, the Männerwasser flows in a roughly west–east direction, emptying into the Losse east of the village; directly across from the river lies the Kaufunger Wald. The village is at an altitude between 310 and 380 m above sea level.

Eschenstruth is well-connected to the regional road network. The primary access route is the Kreisstraße 91 (K91), formerly known as Bundesstraße 7 (B7), which traverses the Losse valley, linking Eschenstruth to neighboring towns such as Helsa and Hessisch Lichtenau. Additionally, the completion of the Bundesautobahn 44 (A44) has significantly enhanced connectivity. Notably, the Tunnel Hirschhagen, inaugurated on October 7, 2022, connects the Helsa-Ost and Hessisch Lichtenau-West interchanges, facilitating efficient travel to and from Eschenstruth. This tunnel, with a length of approximately 4.2 kilometers, is among the longest road tunnels in Germany.

About 2.5 km north of Eschenstruth, in the area of the Söhre (Stiftswald Kaufungen), the Bielstein (528.7 m above sea level) rises with its approximately 15‑m‑high basalt column known as the Bilsteinkirche. Slightly to the west stands the Michelskopf (about 485 m above sea level), where former basalt quarries have given rise to the Michelskopf lakes. Approximately 2.2 km north‑northeast of Eschenstruth, toward Helsa, is the Lewalterbrunnen, named after the folksong researcher Johann Lewalter. About 1.5 km west of the village lies the nature reserve Heubruchwiesen bei Eschenstruth (NSG No. 163667), established in 1989 and covering 51.49 hectares. Beyond that is the abandoned village (Wüstung) of Lobesrode, also known as Lubisrode.

== History ==
The first documentary mention of Eschenstruth dates from 1126, recorded by Archbishop Adalbert of Mainz. Shortly thereafter, during the 12th century, construction began on the local church. The village comprised 45 households in 1585.

Eschenstruth remained unharmed during the Thirty Years' War (1618–1648). Beginning in 1687, a school building was constructed (located at Mittelgasse 9 and 11), and a linen-weavers’ guild started to establish itself in the village—reaching its peak in the 19th century.

During the period of the Napoleonic Kingdom of Westphalia (1807–1813), Eschenstruth belonged to the Kanton Kaufungen. In 1879 the Kassel–Waldkappel railway (Lossetalbahn) was inaugurated.

On 1 August 1972, as part of the territorial reform in Hesse, Eschenstruth was incorporated—together with Helsa-Wickenrode and St. Ottilien—into the present-day municipality of Helsa. In 2001, Helsa celebrated its 875th anniversary.

=== Forced Labor Camp and DP Camp Rochelle ===
During the Second World War, about 1.25 km northeast of Eschenstruth, in the lower valley of a small Losse tributary (the Rohrgraben), a forced labor camp was established. Approximately 1,000 women—conscripted to work at the explosives factory in Hessisch Lichtenau—were housed in the camp. After 1945, the site initially served as an American military barracks before being converted in 1947 into a Displaced Persons (DP) camp known as "DP Camp Rochelle". This camp replaced a closed facility in Hessisch Lichtenau (Lager Vereinshaus) and in March 1947 was expanded to accommodate several hundred Polish DPs previously housed at DP Camp Babenhausen. Courses from the Jewish Vocational School Masada were also offered at the camp.

In March 1949 the DP camp was closed and the facility was converted into the first closed refugee settlement in Hesse, officially inaugurated as the refugee settlement Waldhof on 30 November 1949. In July 1950, during a meeting of expellees in the Waldsiedlung (which had been incorporated into Eschenstruth in 1951), a memorial was unveiled—although it was removed in 1960. A "List of the Residents of the Jewish DP Camp Rochelle in Eschenstruth near Kassel" from 30 July 1947 has been preserved.

== Coat of Arms ==
The heraldic animal of Eschenstruth is the European Goldfinch, known locally as the "Blutfink", "Dompfaff" or "Gimpel." The inhabitants of Eschenstruth acquired the nickname "Blutfinken" because, until the mid-16th century, capturing and training young goldfinches was an important supplementary source of income. Due to the relatively poor soil on the elevated ground where Eschenstruth was founded, residents innovatively captured young goldfinches (four to five days old) from their nests and reared them at home. These birds become remarkably tame in captivity. After being fed until they were ready to fly, the male goldfinches were trained, morning, noon, and evening, by a mentor whistling tunes such as "Das Ännchen von Tharau," "Mit dem Pfeil, dem Bogen," or "Ach, wie ist's möglich vor." After eight months of training, the birds could perform the melody flawlessly. At that time, one well-trained goldfinch could fetch up to fifty marks—a considerable sum for a weaver or a shoemaker. Today, the capture of goldfinches is no longer permitted.
