= Bielefelder Kinderchor =

German children's choir

- Choir
- Origin: Bielefeld
- Founded: 1932
- Genre: Children's choir
- Chief conductor: Friedrich Oberschelp; Jürgen Oberschelp

Bielefelder Kinderchor is a children's choir founded in 1932 in Bielefeld by Friedrich Oberschelp in 1932 and led by him until 1984, when his son Jürgen Oberschelp took over until 2016. The choir, the first mixed children's choir in Germany, has made popular recordings and toured internationally. It was famous for its Christmas concerts, several each season filling the Rudolf-Oetker-Halle, but they were discontinued in 2014.

== History ==
=== Friedrich Oberschelp ===
The Bielefelder Kinderchor was founded in 1932 by Friedrich Oberschelp, a teacher at the Fröbelschule elementary school in Bielefeld. It was the first mixed children's choir in Germany. Rehearsals were first held at the school's Turnhalle (gymnasium), for children from age 10. Under the Nazi regime, the choir had to join the Hitlerjugend. In 1942, they spent four weeks in Salzburg for concerts.

The Bielefelder Kinderchor became famous for Weihnachtskonzerte (Christmas concerts) conducted by Oberschelp before Christmas at the Rudolf-Oetker-Halle. Sometimes up to 14 Christmas concerts were held in one season for sold-out halls, leading to substantial income for the choir. The 1937 statutes requested that every singer became a member of the association, with a membership fee. It also installed an advisory group of parents of the young singers. In case of dissolving, the funds of the association were to be given to a charity organisation chosen by the mayor of Bielefeld.

From 1950, a house was built for the choir at today's Furtwänglerstraße 14, designed by the town's Baurat (building adviser), Kirchner. Parents of singers helped actively and by donations. In 1951, the statutes said: "Der Verein bezweckt ausschließlich und unmittelbar die stimmlich musikalische Ausbildung der Jugend. In diesem Rahmen will er durch Pflege des deutschen Liedgutes aufbauende Kulturarbeit leisten" (The association aims exclusively and directly at the vocal musical education of the youth. Within this framework, it wants to do constructive cultural work through the cultivation of German song). The choir focused on German Volkslied and songs of German romanticism. Tours took the singers first to the Ruhr and Rhine, later to Hungary, Japan and the U.S.. In 1977, the choir performed in a concert at the Fröbelschule, on the occasion of the school's 75th anniversary.

=== Jürgen Oberschelp ===
Friedrich Oberschelp was the conductor until 1984. He was then succeeded by his son Jürgen Oberschelp, who had been a choir member. He gave the last Christmas concert at the Rudolf-Oetker-Halle in 2013, and retired in 2016.

== Recordings ==
Recordings of the Bielefelder Kinderchor conducted by Oberschelp were advertised internationally, such as in the English trade magazine Record Mail in April 1959, mentioning Mendelssohn's "Hebe deine Augen auf" and Weber's "Wir winden dir den Jungfernkranz", among others. They recorded an album of Christmas carols in 1961, beginning with "Vom Himmel hoch". They recorded sacred music, titled Ave Maria - Agnus Dei, with tenor Rudolf Schock and the Nordwestdeutsche Philharmonie conducted by Wilhelm Schüchter in 1964. They recorded another album of carols named Alle Jahre wieder, and an album of German Volkslieder. Their 1979 single of the Christmas carol "Am Weihnachtsbaume die Lichter brennen" made the German charts. They made a recording of mostly Volkslieder, Das große Jubiläumskonzert, on the occasion of the 50th anniversary in 1982, released by Ariola-Eurodisc, Gütersloh / Munich.
