= Comedy music =

Comedic music genre

- Other names: Musical comedy music
- Stylistic origins: Comedy; popular music; folk music; Ragtime
- Typical instruments: Vocals; various instruments

Subgenres
- Parody music; novelty song

Fusion genres
- Comedy rock; comedy hip hop

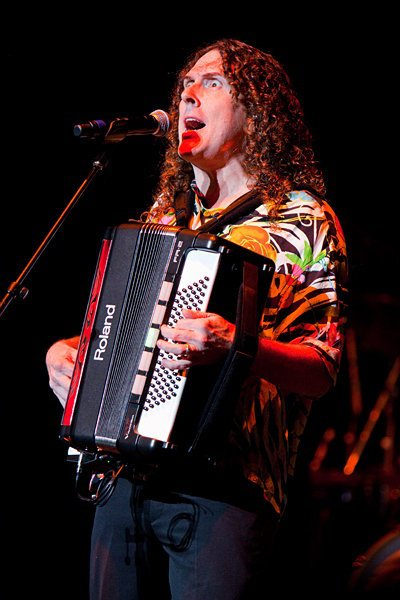
"Weird Al" Yankovic performing live in concert during his 2010 tour

Comedy music or musical comedy is a genre of music that is comedic in nature. Its history can be traced back to the first century in ancient Greece and Rome, moving forward in time to the Medieval Period, Classical and Romantic eras, and the 20th century. Various forms of comedic musical theatre, including "musical play", "musical comedy", "operetta" and "light opera", evolved from the comic operas first developed in late 17th-century Italy. Popular music artists in the 20th century interested in comedy include Allan Sherman, Frank Zappa, Tiny Tim, Barenaked Ladies, Randy Newman, and "Weird Al" Yankovic. Artists in the 21st century include Tenacious D, Flight of the Conchords, The Lonely Island, Bo Burnham, Ninja Sex Party and The Axis of Awesome.

Comedy music is often associated with counterculture, due to the subversive messages it displays. This informative nature of comedy music also contributes to the improvement of learning inside and outside the classroom. Forms of entertainment like musical theatre often incorporate comedy music as well.

To create comic effects in music, composers have developed several principal compositional techniques, including the use of comic text, musical parody, and unexpected juxtapositions of syntactical elements among others. Comedy music can be further categorized into several types, such as parody music, novelty song, comedy rock, and comedy hip hop. Awards dedicated to comedy music include the Grammy Award for Best Comedy Album, the Golden Globe Award for Best Motion Picture – Musical or Comedy, and the Musical Comedy Awards.

== Comedy-music relationship ==
Comedy is a form of art that addresses comic or humorous situations, or even serious ones with a light or satirical approach. Music is also a form of art, and it is concerned with the rhythm, melody, and harmony of vocal, instrumental, or mechanical sounds.

One similarity between comedy and music is the way they both evoke psychological and emotional effects in their listeners, without them fully understanding the specific reason for their emotions of hilarity. Comedy in entertainment is also established as musical codes set up and confirm the audience's understanding of the symbolic meaning of a scene, before subverting that understanding to play with the audience's response. Thus, a multi-faceted musical experience has the ability to elicit emotions such as humor and comedy in its listeners. This type of musical experience can be identified as comedy music.

== History ==
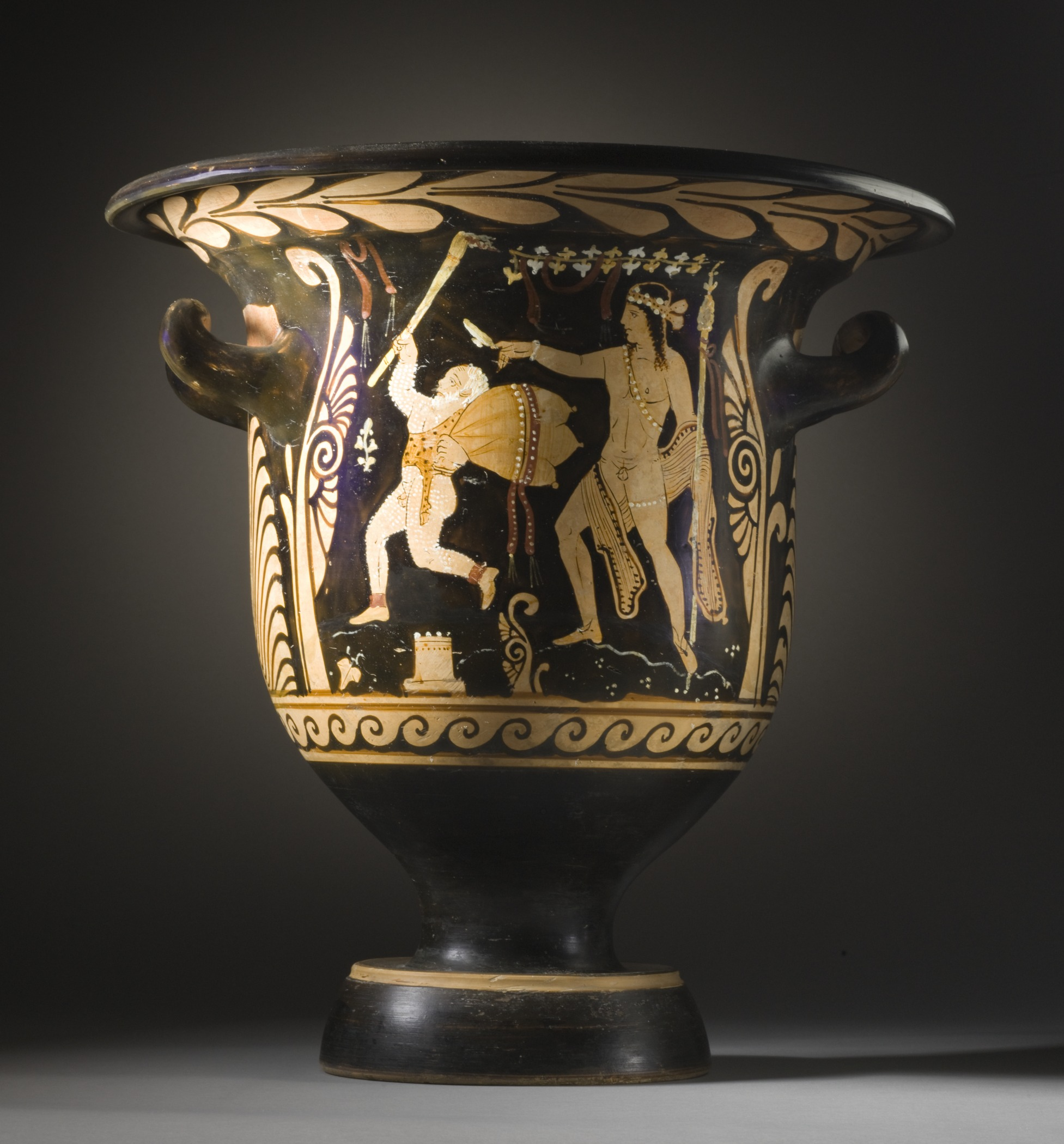
Ancient Greek bell krater pottery with an elderly satyr followed by young Dionysos

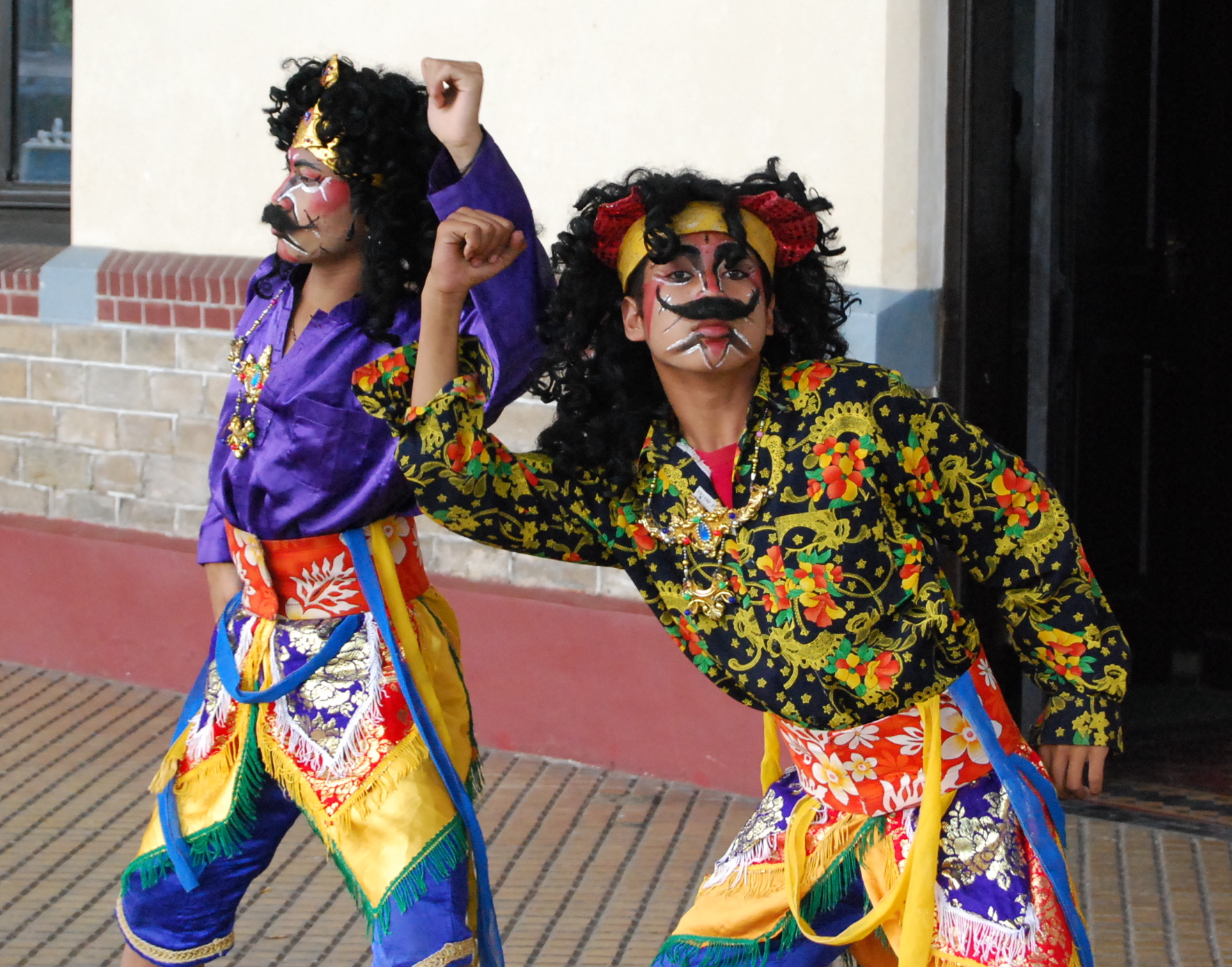
Dancers performing physical comedy

=== Ancient Greece and Rome ===
The first uses of comedy in music can be traced back to the first century in ancient Greece and Rome, where poets and playwrights entertained with puns and wordplay.

The origins of comedy play in ancient Greece are first recorded on pottery in the 6th century BCE, on which illustrations of actors dressed as horses, satyrs, and dancers in exaggerated costumes are painted on. Another early origin are the explicit sexually humorous poems of Hipponax in the 6th century BCE and Archilocus in the 7th century BCE. The third origin are the phallic songs sung during Dionysiac festivals, as mentioned by Aristotle.

Playwrights of comedic theatre include Aristophanes and Menander whose works mocked politicians, philosophers, and fellow artists.

=== Medieval Period ===
In the Medieval Period, minstrels, troubadours and court jesters would continue performing comedic music, some satirical, accompanied by musical instruments. Court jesters in particular would display their wit and humor through songs, jokes, and physical comedy as a way to offer critique on society and authority, working in public squares or officially hired as licensed fools to work directly under the king or queen.

=== Classical and Romantic eras ===
Forms of comic opera first developed in late 17th-century Italy, leading to the emergence of opera buffa as an alternative to opera seria. It quickly made its way to France, where it became opéra comique, and eventually, in the following century, French operetta, with Jacques Offenbach as its most accomplished practitioner. Many countries developed their own genres of comic opera, incorporating the Italian and French models along with their own musical traditions. Examples include German singspiel, Viennese operetta, Spanish zarzuela, Russian comic opera, English ballad and Savoy opera, North American operetta and musical comedy.

In the Classical and Romantic eras, composers like Haydn, Beethoven, and Schumann would place comic passages side by side with the more serious sections to bring out the contrast between them. This technique is called juxtaposition, which is a basic element of comedy. Haydn's Symphony No 45 of 1772 (the Farewell Symphony) and his Symphony No 94 of 1792 (the Surprise Symphony), are the most famous examples. A tradition of toy symphonies – featuring toy musical instruments – began in the classical era and continued into the 19th century and beyond.

=== 19th century ===
Comic songs diffused in the popular market while the American Civil War persisted. According to Irwin Silber, they marked the "beginning of an indigenous laughter, an American way of punning, cracking jokes, and puncturing the most inflated balloon on the political or artistic horizon", although their humor has since aged. Some songs approach the hardships of army life in a light or humorous manner, such as "Goober Peas" and "Farewell to Grog", the latter a mock response to the banning of grog for Union navy personnel in 1862. There were songs about people trying to dodge the draft or obtain a substitute, including "Come In Out of the Draft", a tale of a conscript who tried to evade the draft through marriage but could not find a woman. And the most famous composition opposing the draft, "Grafted into the Army", was comedic and satirical.

=== 20th century ===
Progress in comedy music continued over years, until vaudeville entertainers of the early 20th century added lyrics to musical numbers. In 1923, one of the first comedy music hits "Yes! We Have No Bananas" sung by Eddie Cantor was released.

In 1924 Billy Rose asked, "Does the Spearmint Lose Its Flavor on the Bedpost Overnight?". In 1958 the song was rereleased as, "Does Your Chewing Gum Lose Its Flavour (On the Bedpost Overnight?)" by Lonnie Donegan, the King of Skiffle.

In the 1940s, Spike Jones created songs with a comedy technique of replacing several musical notes with humorous sound effects. Followed in 1951, Stan Freberg released a series of cover songs that addressed the issue of commercialism in that age.

In the 1950s Fritz Spiegl organised a popular series of "April Fools" concerts in Liverpool. The idea was subsequently taken up by Gerard Hoffnung in London at the Royal Festival Hall. The 1956 "Hoffnung Music Festival" played to a sell-out audience in the hall and to BBC viewers throughout Britain. Two more Hoffnung Festivals followed, the second in 1958 and the third in 1961, presented as a tribute after his death. Contributions included Donald Swann's revised version of Haydn's Surprise Symphony to make it considerably more surprising, and Malcolm Arnold's A Grand, Grand Overture, scored for orchestra and three vacuum cleaners, (dedicated to US President Hoover). After Hoffnung's death, similar concerts were promoted by his widow Annetta.

Malcolm Arnold's Toy Symphony was first performed at a Savoy Hotel fund raising dinner in London on 28 November 1957, with toy instruments played by a group of eminent composers, musicians and personalities, including Thomas Armstrong, Edric Cundell, Gerard Hoffnung, Eileen Joyce, Steuart Wilson and Leslie Woodgate.

On 17 July 1958 the Mammoth Concert of Comic Music was held at the Royal Albert Hall. Pieces performed included a concerto for motor horn and orchestra by Antony Hopkins, Overture: The Masterdrinkers by Spike Hughes and a concertino for piano tuner and orchestra by Lambert Williamson.

The 1960s and 1970s saw the rise of numerous comedy music artists whose careers went on for decades. These artists include: Allan Sherman, Shel Silverstein, Frank Zappa, Tiny Tim, and Randy Newman. Particularly in 1970, the radio host Barret Hansen – better known as Dr. Demento – appeared. He played tracks sent in by amateur artists, one of which was a 16-year-old 'Weird Al' Yankovic.

Yankovic released his first album in 1983, which eventually led to a 14-album contract that he did not complete until 2014. For over four decades, he released multiple hit parodies and originals, which made him a major player in the genre of comedy music and the counterculture associated with it.

In 1994, The Actors' Gang members Jack Black and Kyle Gass formed the iconic comedy rock duo Tenacious D and went on to release their debut album in 2001.

=== 21st century ===
A popular 21st century musical comedy act is Flight of the Conchords, a New Zealand duo composed of musicians Bret McKenzie and Jemaine Clement, which became the basis of the self-titled BBC radio series (2004) and then the HBO American television series (2007–2009).

At the turn of the millennium, the band Steel Panther formed in Los Angeles with songs, live shows and videos parodying the stereotypical glam metal genre and lifestyle of the 1980s.

In 2001, The Lonely Island formed in Berkeley, California with members Akiva Schaffer, Andy Samberg and Jorma Taccone, who starred in a series of SNL Digital Shorts featuring songs like Motherlover, Dick in a Box, I'm on a Boat, I Just Had Sex and more.

Through the rest of the 2000s, a movement of comedy rock acts started to take place in Australia with bands such as The Axis of Awesome, The Beards, The Kransky Sisters and Tripod.

When musician Matt Farley discovered the only songs from his band Moes Haven that were getting any plays had more-comedic titles, he switched his focus to novelty songs in 2008. Since then, Farley has written over 22,000 songs about potty humor, celebrities, food and more under band names like The Toilet Bowl Cleaners, Papa Razzi and the Photogs, The Very Nice Interesting Singer Man and The Hungry Food Band.

Taking rock and synth-pop influence in the more comedic direction, the duo Ninja Sex Party formed in 2009 with members Dan "Danny Sexbang" Avidan and Brian "Ninja Brian" Wecht who went on to record five albums of original material, three cover albums and one re-recording album. Ever since their album Under the Covers, NSP has been backed by the band TWRP. For three albums, they collaborated with animator and internet personality Arin "Egoraptor" Hanson to create the video game themed side project Starbomb.

In 2010, rappers Peter "Nice Peter" Shukoff and Lloyd "Epic Lloyd" Ahlquist created the web-series Epic Rap Battles of History, a show that pinned famous figures both real and fictional in rap battles against each other. It has run for seven seasons, featuring stars like "Weird Al" Yankovic, Snoop Dogg, T-Pain and more.

The beginning of the 2010s saw Nerf Herder front man Parry Gripp starting to release a long series of successful tween pop songs such as "It's Raining Tacos", "Space Unicorn" and "Do You Like Waffles?" dealing with themes of animals and food, gaining him the nickname "the "Weird Al" Yankovic of YouTube".

== Associations ==
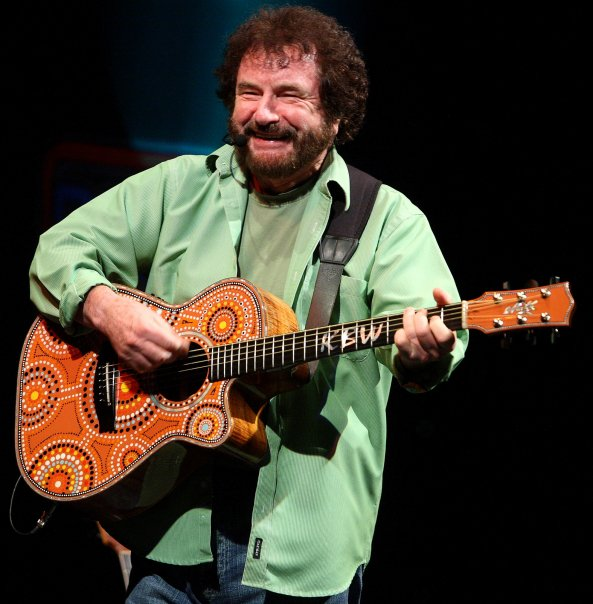
Kevin Bloody Wilson live in Scotland, 2009

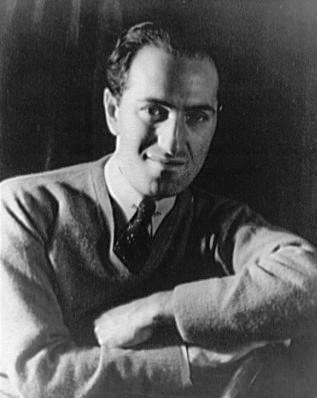
George Gershwin, 1898–1937

=== Counterculture ===
Counterculture is associated with comedy music due to the individual natures of comedy and music. Comedy often contains progressive and subversive messages that intend to provide listeners with information about issues, Injustices, and other topics that are important to the artist. Music has the ability to explain political issues in a way that is easily acceptable for a wide range of listeners. Both comedy and music have the power to create movements and spread ideas, allowing them to effectively advocate counterculture through the ages, one of them being the challenge of authority.

'Weird Al' Yankovic spread his message about the privilege of the upper class through his comedy music song, titled 'First World Problems':

My maid is cleaning the bathroom, so I can't take a shower / When I do, the water starts getting cold after an hour / I couldn't order off the breakfast menu, cause I slept in till two / Then I filled up on bread, didn't leave any room for tiramisu / Oh no, there's a pixel out in the corner of my laptop screen / I don't have any bills in my wallet small enough for the vending machine / Some idiot just called me up on the phone, what!? Don't they know how to text? OMG! / I got first world, first world problems.

Kevin Bloody Wilson's song – 'Living Next Door to Alan' – is about an indigenous family claiming land neighboring the millionaire Alan Bond:

They came down from Meekatharra / In a burned-out blue FJ / That farted and just shit itself in Jutland Parade / Right next door to Bondy's / When the smoke had cleared a voice said: / 'Eh .. this place look all right / We'll tell the government it's a sacred site / Dead fuckin' easy' / 'Good day Mr Alan Bond, how you goin' bloke? / Hey, I'm your brand-new neighbour ... hey, mate you got a smoke? / And I think I'm gonna like it here / Livin' next door to Alan'.

=== Education ===
Comedy and music have both been found to improve the effectiveness of learning inside and outside the classroom. Comedy improves short-term issue recognition, and can improve a student's learning by attracting and holding their attention for a longer duration of the class, also ensuring their continued motivation and engagement. Music improves a student's vocabulary and comprehensive skills, simultaneously encouraging them to think creatively. An example of the implementation of comedy music in education is the incorporation of parody songs to learn the English language.

=== Entertainment ===
In the 1920s and 1930s, musical theatre is a form of entertainment that often incorporates comedy. In a musical setting, rhetorico-musical techniques contribute in creating comedic effect, and an example of this is aposiopesis, which is the device of suddenly breaking off in musical speech for dramatic or emotional effect. Another contributing aspect to it is dance – particularly tap dance. Musical comedies differ from book musicals as they focus more on comedy and dance rather than on drama and character development. This era's musical comedies include works created by brothers George and Ira Gershwin, and these musicals are: 'Strike Up the Band', 'Lady, Be Good', 'Oh, Kay!', 'Girl Crazy', 'Crazy for You', and 'Of Thee I Sing'.

== Principal techniques ==
To create comic effects in music, composers have developed the following principal compositional techniques.

=== Comic text ===
The use of comic text or funny words immediately conveys humor. This can be traced back to 13th century Motets, but it is the 18th century opera buffa that first explored deeply all the aspects of verbal comedy. An example of this is Mozart's Le nozze di Figaro composed in 1786.

=== Musical parody ===
Musical parodies satirize certain styles or particular works of music. An example of this is Mozart's Ein musikalischer Spass composed in 1787, which parodies the style of incompetent composers and Siegfried Ochs's variations on 'Kommt ein Vogel geflogen' that models the style of particular composers for each variation.

=== Juxtapositions of syntactical elements ===
The use of unexpected juxtapositions of syntactical elements include changing the lengths of phrases, startling turns of melody and dynamics, and contrasting textures. An example of this is a minuet from Haydn's Symphony No. 104 composed in 1796, where rests and a crescendo of the timpani interrupt the regular flow of music.

=== Musical description ===
Musical description includes animal or even nonsensical sound effects that illustrate certain events or situations within the music piece. Examples of this are the bird calls in Beethoven's Pastoral Symphony composed in 1808, the bleating of sheep in Strauss's Don Quixote composed in 1897, and sound effects that illustrate hunting or market scenes in Medieval Italian caccie.

=== References to particular styles ===
Inclusion of folk or popular music techniques in certain passages creates humorous effect. Examples of this are the clumsy folk-like dance technique incorporated in the last movement of Haydn's Symphony No. 82 – nicknamed The Bear – composed in 1786 and Hindemith's use of the Shimmy in his Suite 1922 for Piano.

=== Incongruency ===
The use of incongruency creates contrasts between music styles and techniques, and this is done with parodistic intent. An example of this is Haydn's Symphony No. 60 – nicknamed Il Distratto – composed in 1774.

=== Orchestral devices ===
The use of unusual orchestral devices creates the element of surprise. Examples of this are the tuning of violins in the last movement of Haydn's Symphony No. 60 composed in 1774, the use of col legno in the last movement of Berlioz's Symphonie fantastique composed in 1830, and the use of toy instruments in various classical pieces from the 1760s to the 21st century.

=== Allusions to a famous comic character ===
The descriptive use of music can be used to allude to famous comic characters. Examples of this are Elgar's symphonic poem on Falstaff composed in 1913 and Strauss's depiction of Till Eulenspiegel composed in 1895.

=== Texture, dynamics, rhythm, and melodic design ===
The use of unusual effects of texture, dynamics, rhythm, and melodic design creates comic features within the music piece. Examples of this are the exaggerated large intervals of the bass voice in 18th century opera buffa and the two Sopranos showing off their high register singing in Mozart's Der Schauspieldirektor composed in 1785.

=== Keys and modulations ===
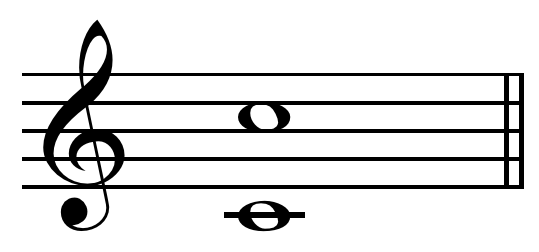
The perfect octave, a consonant interval

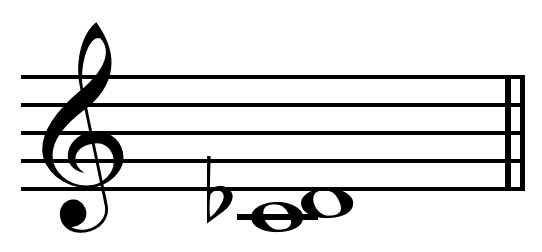
The minor second, a dissonance

The use of strange keys and distant modulations respectively create dissonance and distant harmonic movements. These musical devices create a subtle humorous effect. Examples of this are Renaissance Madrigals and Motets and Baroque Cantatas.

=== References to past styles ===
References to past styles and techniques are presented in a new context, and this is played with the assumption that the audience is familiar with the referenced style and technique. An example of this is the referencing of 18th century forms and instrumentation by Neoclassic composers Stravinsky and Hindemith in the 20th century.

=== Quotations of musical materials ===
Musical quotations are blended together in vertical and horizontal orders to form a medley. In the Renaissance era, this type of musical composition is called the quodlibet. In the Romantic era, they are often medleys performed in Operas. Examples of this are C. Hopfner's operetta for men's voices – Das Gastspiel der Lucca – composed in 1875 and Charles Ives's Holiday Symphony composed in 1913.

=== Movement titles ===
Composers like Haydn and Beethoven often use specific movement titles to identify their work as humorous, labeling them as 'scherzo', which means 'joke'. An example of this is the scherzo from Tchaikovsky's Symphony No. 4 composed in 1878.

=== Tempo modifications ===
Tempo modifications not only sets the pace of music, but also imply mood and style. An example of this is Haydn's symphony finales in the late 18th century, where tempo modifications are used to display character.

=== Notation ===
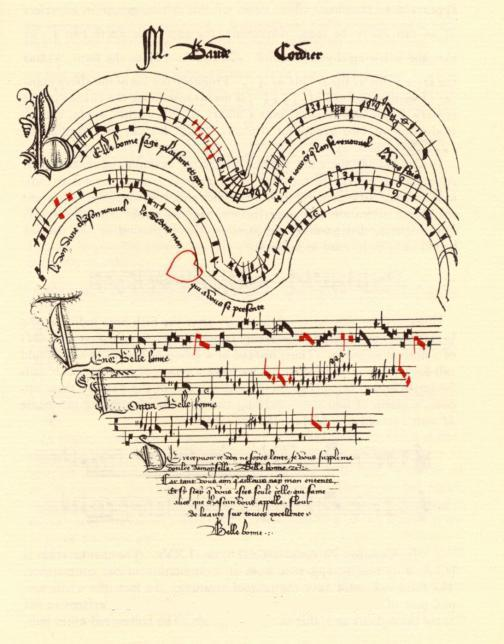
Baude Cordier's 'Belle bonne' heart-shaped manuscript

The use of visually uncommon notations has been employed in the complex polyphony of the late 14th century, puzzle canons of the Renaissance and Baroque eras, and aleatoric music of the 20th century. An example of this is Baude Cordier's 'Belle bonne' heart-shaped manuscript composed in the late 14th century.

=== Genre designations ===
The use of specific terms in genre designations identifies certain types of music as humorous. Obvious designations include opera buffa, while subtler ones include terms like canzonetta, chansonetta, and operetta. An example of this is Schumann's use of the term 'humoresque' to designate humorous music, as demonstrated in his own work – Humoreske – composed in 1838.

=== Performance styles ===
Composers make fun of certain performance styles through the use of parody. Examples of this are Victor Borge who made fun of conventional classical music by mimicking well-known pieces of music and Anna Russell who satirized Wagner.

=== Texting of instrumental works ===
Satiric texts are incorporated within instrumental works to convey humor. An example of this is a vocal arrangement of Mozart's overture to Die Zauberflote that begins with "Vivat Carl Maria Weber".

=== Chance ===
The use of chance to combine phrases in musical composition is known as ars combinatoria. In the 20th century, this genre is called aleatoric music or chance music. An example of this is John Cage's Music of Changes composed in 1951.

=== Soggetto cavato ===
Soggetto cavato is a technique that substitutes syllables from solmization for letters, creating a musical cryptogram. An example of this is the use of the letters ASCH and SCHA Schumann's Carnaval composed in 1835.

== Types ==
=== Parody music ===
Parody music is a subgenre of comedy music that incorporates comic or satirical features, and is a reinterpretation of the original it is based upon.

Bart Baker parodies Nicki Minaj's song – 'Anaconda' – by replacing original lyrics with new ones:

I'm dry humping bamboo in a jungle / My butt's so big it's like two gigantic bubbles / And I always show it off 'cause it's my greatest asset / But it's enhanced by surgery, yes, it's made out of plastic / It's not real, real, real.

Peter Schickele composed and performed music allegedly written by the fictional P. D. Q. Bach, the "only forgotten son" of the Bach family.

=== Novelty song ===
Novelty song is a subgenre of comedy music that is humorous, unique and original, sounding different from everything else being played in the media.

Examples of novelty song artists include Tom Lehrer and Alan Sherman.

=== Comedy rock ===
Comedy rock is a subgenre of comedy music that focuses on Dissenting humor, a merge of youthful silliness and rebellious instincts.

Stephen Lynch sings about the death of his grandfather in his song, titled 'Grandfather':

When Grandfather dies / Life will be strange / When Grandfather dies / My whole world will change / When Grandfather dies / I'll scream and I'll yell / 'Cause I'll be fuckin' rich as hell.

=== Comedy hip hop ===
Comedy hip hop is a subgenre of comedy music that incorporates humor in the rap lyrics and in the music itself.

The Lonely Island released their first comedy hip hop song – 'Ka-Blamo!' – in 2001:

When you're mining for coal and you forget what coal is / And you're sure to be fired, because that's your job! / When a mole's in your ass and you wonder where the mole is / You're screwed man, a mole is in your ass. Job!

== Awards ==
=== Grammy Award for Best Comedy album ===
The Grammy Award for Best Comedy Album acknowledges both spoken word and musical comedy albums. It is presented by the National Academy of Recording Arts and Sciences of the United States, and is first awarded in 1959 until the present day.

=== Golden Globe Award for Best Motion Picture – Musical or Comedy ===
The Golden Globe Award for Best Motion Picture – Musical or Comedy recognizes musical or comedy films. It is presented by the Hollywood Foreign Press Association of the United States, and is first awarded in 1952 until the present day.

=== Musical Comedy Awards ===
The Musical Comedy Awards is an annual competition that acknowledges the United Kingdom's up-and-coming as well as established artists in the musical comedy genre. It is first set up in 2008 by founder Ed Chappel.

== See also ==
- Novelty song
- Outsider music
- Victor Borge, "The Clown Prince of Denmark", famous for his own mixture of comedy and music.
