= Wolfgang Seifen =

German organist, composer and music pedagogue (born 1956)

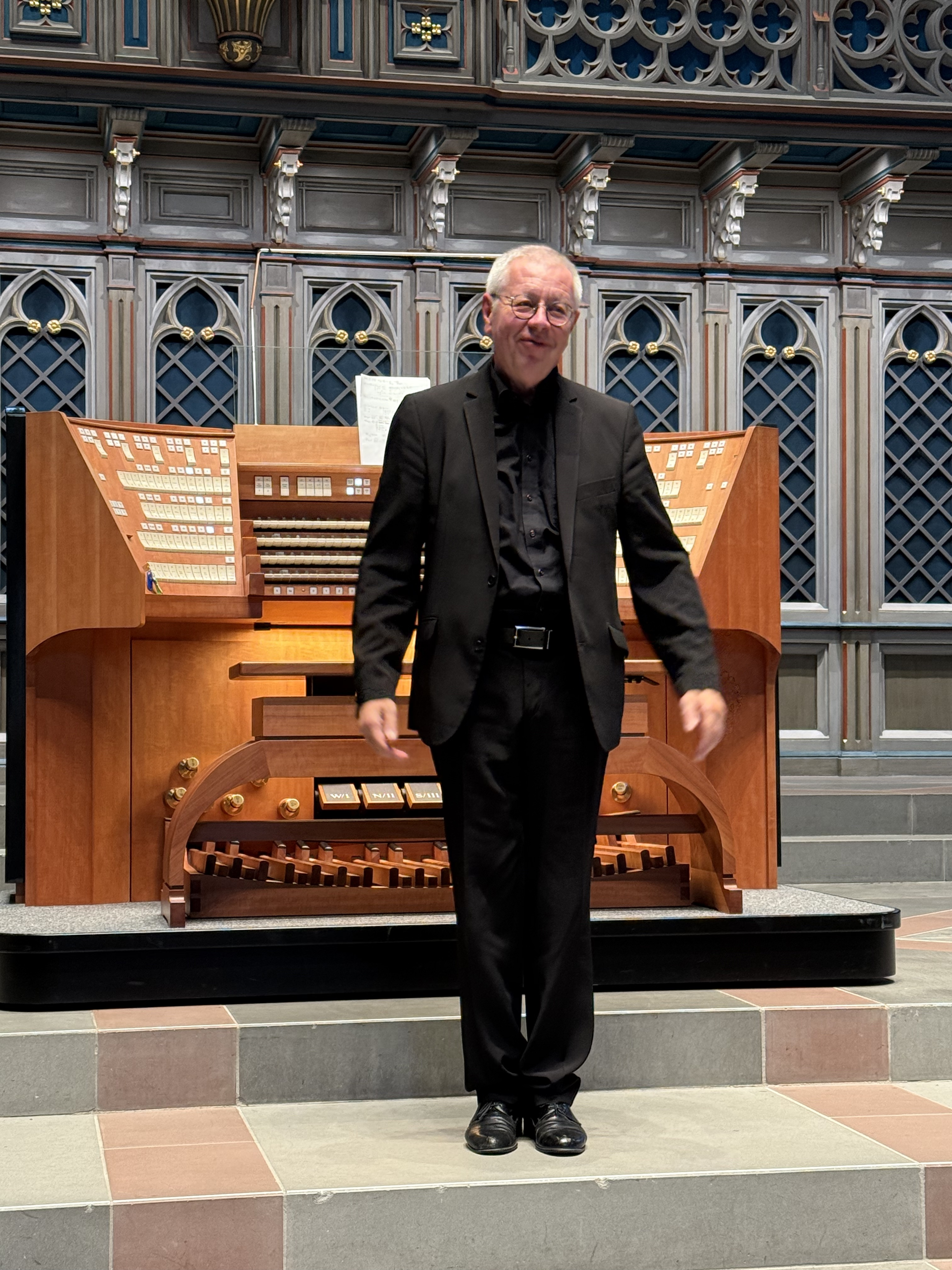
Wolfgang Seifen, 2025

Wolfgang Seifen (born 1956, in Bergheim) is a German organist, improviser, composer, and music pedagogue.

Wolfgang Seifen grew up in Oberaussem in the district of Bergheim. He received his foundations in music theory, piano and organ from Hermann Kräling. From 1967, he attended the Gymnasium of the Regensburger Domspatzen. From 1973 to 1976, he studied sacred music at the Gregoriushaus in Aachen. From 1976 to 1983, he was organist and music director at St. Sebastian church in Nettetal-Lobberich and, from 1983 until 2000, organist at the Marienbasilica in Kevelaer. In Kevelaer, he founded the Freundes- und Förderkreis der Basilikakonzerte and the Internationale Orgeltage. Along with Paul Wisskirchen, Seifen founded the International Altenberg Organ Academy for Improvisation at Altenberg Cathedral, where he was permanent lecturer from 1987 to 2022.

At the same time, Seifen taught the organ class for improvisation and liturgical organ playing at the University of Music and Performing Arts in Stuttgart (1989 to 1992). From 1992 to 2000, he was lecturer of improvisation and liturgical organ playing at the Robert Schumann Hochschule in Düsseldorf, where he was appointed honorary professor in 1995. In October 2000, he was appointed professor of improvisation and liturgical organ playing at the University of the Arts in Berlin; he retired in October 2021. In 2002, he was appointed by Cardinal Sterzinsky to the Church Music Commission of the Archdiocese of Berlin. From 2003 to 2009, he was chairman of the Conference of Directors of Catholic institutions for Sacred Music in Germany.

From 2004 to 2022, Seifen was the titular organist at the Kaiser Wilhelm Memorial Church in Berlin, where he was the artistic director of the International Organ Improvisation Festival Berlin and (along with Helmut Hoeft) of the organ concert series Meisterkonzerte Berlin. He has published numerous works on organ building and organ improvisation, as well as compositions for choir, organ and chamber music. He has also participated in numerous radio and television productions, released CD recordings of organ improvisations and pursues an extensive international concert career. Since March 2024, Wolfgang Seifen has been chairman of the Orgelbauverein Kevelaer e.V.

== Compositions ==
=== Organ ===
- Allegretto scherzando (Hermann Rau (ed.): Ludus Organisticus. Berlin: Strube, 1995).
- Allegro (Ludus Organisticus. Berlin: Strube, 1995).
- Arabesque "Salve regina" (Wolfgang Seifen: Orgelwerke. Mainz: Schott, 2013).
- Cantabile (Ludus Organisticus. Berlin: Strube, 1995).
- Cantilena (Hans-Peter Bähr (ed.): Idylle – 20 meditative Orgelstücke. St. Augustin: Butz: 2024).
- Choralfantasie: Prelude "Christ ist erstanden" (Seifen: Orgelwerke. Mainz: Schott, 2013).
- Elevation (nach der Trauung) (Seifen: Orgelwerke. Mainz: Schott, 2013).
- Fantaisie populaire (Seifen: Orgelwerke. Mainz: Schott, 2013).
- Finale "Salve, festa dies" (Seifen: Orgelwerke. Mainz: Schott, 2013).
- Fuge (Offertoire) (Seifen: Orgelwerke. Mainz: Schott, 2013).
- Introduktion, Choral und Toccata (Seifen: Orgelwerke. Mainz: Schott, 2013).
- Konzertstück (1997).
- Macht hoch die Tür. Phantasie im romantischen Stil (Eibelstadt: Stretta, 2013).
- Meditation (Communio) (Seifen: Orgelwerke. Mainz: Schott, 2013).
- Messe de Mariage: Marche Pontificale (Entrée) (Seifen: Orgelwerke. Mainz: Schott, 2013).
- Prière (Ludus Organisticus. Berlin: Strube, 1995).
- Thema mit Variationen (Ludus Organisticus. Berlin: Strube, 1995).
- Toccata (Sortie) (Seifen: Orgelwerke. Mainz: Schott, 2013).

=== Orgel with other instruments ===
- Konzert for organ and orchestra (Aachen: Musikverlag Klaus Schruff).
- Symphonie for orchestra and organ (2022) (Eibelstadt: Stretta, 2024).

=== Sacred choral works ===
- Angelus Autem for choir (SATB) a cappella (Berlin: Berliner Chormusik-Verlag, 2002).
- Die Nacht ist vorgedrungen for choir (SSAATTBB) a cappella (Berlin: Berliner Chormusik-Verlag, 2008).
- Gott, der die lebendige Quelle ist for choir (SATB) a cappella (Klaus Heizmann (ed.): Segne und behüte uns. Mainz: Schott, 2014).
- Gott trage dich über Berge und durch Täler for choir (SATB) a cappella (Segne und behüte uns. Mainz: Schott, 2014).
- In paradisum deducant te Angeli for choir (SATB) a cappella (Berlin: Berliner Chormusik-Verlag, 2003).
- Jauchzet dem Herrn – 100. Psalm for children's choir, 2 flutes, 2 violins, and cello (1977) (Berlin: Berliner Chormusik-Verlag, 2004).
- Johannes-Passion for choir (SATB) and soloists.
- Messe Solenelle for choir and organ (Mainz: Schott, 2016).
- Missa in G for choir (SATB) a cappella (1978) (Berlin: Berliner Chormusik-Verlag, 2002).
- Missa festiva "In honorem Sancti Liborii" for choir (SATB) and organ (Mainz: Schott, 2015).
- Missa Solemnis "Tu es Petrus" on the Holy Father's Pope Benedict XVI 80th Birthday for choir (SATB), orchestra, and organ (St. Augustin: Butz, 2010).
- Motetten I for choir (SATB) a cappella (Berlin: Berliner Chormusik-Verlag):
  - Beati mundo corde.
  - Gloriosa dicta sunt.
  - Benedicat vobis.
- Motetten II for choir (SATB) a cappella (Berlin: Berliner Chormusik-Verlag):
  - Exsultet in domino.
  - Beati omnes.
  - Confirma hoc deus.
- Salve Regina for choir (SATB) a cappella (Berlin: Berliner Chormusik-Verlag, 2008).
- Selig sind, die da Leid tragen for choir (SATB) a cappella (Berlin: Berliner Chormusik-Verlag, 2003).
- Tryptique Symphonique for choir, soloists, orchestra, and organ.

=== Miscellaneous works ===
- Vier Frühlingslieder for choir (SSAA) a cappella (Berlin: Berliner Chormusik-Verlag, 2009):
  - Grüss Gott, du schöner Maien.
  - Der Mai, der Mai, der lustige Mai.
  - Singt ein Vogel.
  - Nun will der Lenz uns grüßen.
- Songs with piano / organ accompaniment.

=== Transcriptions and Arrangements ===
- Johannes Brahms: Rhapsody in G minor, op. 79 (transcribed for organ).
- Edvard Grieg: Ballade in G minor, op. 24 (transcribed for organ).
- Alexandre Guilmant: Symphonie in D minor, op. 42 (arranged for choir, soloists, orchestra, and organ).
- Felix Mendelssohn: Songs Without Words (selections) (arranged for choir (SATB) and organ).
- Max Reger: Sonatine in A minor, op. 89 (transcribed for organ).
- Robert Schumann: Dichterliebe, op. 48 (transcribed for choir (SATB) and piano).
- Robert Schumann: "Aufschwung" from Fantasiestücke, op. 12 (transcribed for organ).
- Robert Schumann: Piano Concerto in A minor, op. 54, first movement (transcribed for organ).
- Louis Vierne: Messe Solennelle, op. 16 (arranged for choir, orchestra, and organ).

== Bibliography ==
- Die Stellung der Pfeifenorgel in der römischen Liturgie – Gedanken eines Kirchenmusikers. Sinfonia Sacra. Zeitschrift für katholische Kirchenmusik 1, no. 3 (1993).
- Die Orgelwerke der Marienbasilika zu Kevelaer. Munich: Schnell und Steiner.
- Die Seifert-Orgel der Kerzenkapelle zu Kevelaer. Weeze: Palka.
- Katholische Klanglichkeit. Das Besondere einer Improvisation "sub Communione". Musik und Kirche 71, no. 1 (2001): 12–15.
