= Kommt ein Vogel geflogen =

German-language Volkslied and love song

- Volkslied, love song
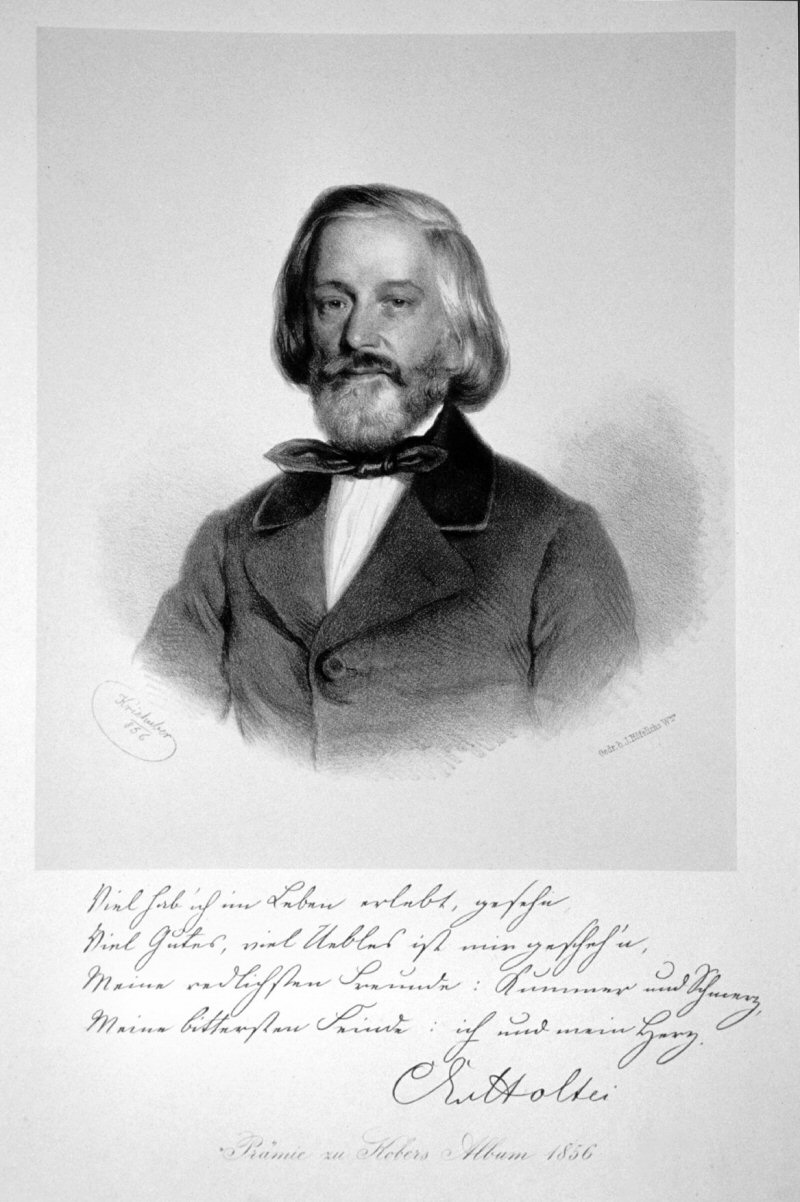
- Von Holtei in 1856
- English: "A bird comes flying"
- Written: 1824
- Text: by Karl von Holtei
- Composed: 19th century or earlier

"Kommt ein Vogel geflogen" ("A Bird Comes Flying") is a German-language Volkslied and love song from Lower Austria. While it was passed down orally, probably in dialect, some text first appeared in print in 1807. Six stanzas appeared in a Posse mit Gesang by Karl von Holtei in Berlin in 1824 and made the song popular. In arrangements, it also became a children's song. Siegfried Ochs treated the melody humorously to variations for piano, imitating different styles of classical composers.

== History ==
"Kommt ein Vogel geflogen" was sung and orally transmitted in Lower Austria, probably in dialect. Two stanzas of its text appeared in 1807 in Tyrol dialect, with a melody different from the one that became popular, published by Johannes Strolz. The song became known by inclusion in a Liederposse, a play with songs entitled Die Wiener in Berlin (The Viennese in Berlin) by Karl von Holtei which premiered in Berlin in 1824. It used the now popular melody with a note in the libretto "in bekannter Weise", which suggests that the melody was already known. Von Holtei probably had heard the song in Vienna.

The melody is similar to the Volkslied "Und die Würzburger Glöckli", which is known only from 1830. In arrangements, the song also became a children's song.

== Original text ==
Von Holtei's Posse mit Gesang of 1824 is written in stylized Austrian dialect. The Prussian author was aware of his limitations, and noted:

Alle Wiener, denen dies Buch in die Hände fällt, bitte ich tausendmal um Verzeihung für die Verstümmelung ihres lieblichen Dialekts. Ich fühle mein Unvermögen, die anmuthigen Klänge, – die besonders in dem Munde der Weiber so bezaubernd ertönen – nachzuahmen. Ich und mein Berliner Setzer wir sind nicht im Stande, dies Ziel zu erreichen und wir bitten deshalb die Augen zuzudrücken.	I ask all Viennese in whose hands this book falls to forgive me a thousand times the mutilation of their lovely dialect. I feel my inability to imitate the graceful sounds - which sound so enchanting especially in the mouths of women. I and my Berlin typesetter are not able to achieve this goal, and therefore we ask you to turn a blind eye.

It is not known which parts of the text were added by Holtei. The fifth stanza was most likely written by him, because it makes sense only in connection with the plot of the play. The second stanza was often omitted in later editions.

The original text from the 19th century addresses a girlfriend ("Diandl", "Schatzerl"). A boy, speaking in the first person, received a note from a girl carried by a little bird, and requests the bird to return a greeting and a kiss to the distant girl.

Kimmt a Vogerl' geflogen,
Setzt si nieder auf mein Fuß,
Hat a Zetterl im Goschl
Und vom Diandl an'n Gruß.

Und a Büchserl zum Schießen
Und an Straußring zum Schlag'n,
Und a Diandl zum Lieben
Muß a frischer Bub' hab'n.

Hast mi allweil vertröstet
Auf die Summeri-Zeit;
Und der Summer is kumma,
Und mei Schatzerl is weit.

Daheim is mei Schatzerl,
In der Fremd bin ich hier,
Und es fragt halt kei Katzerl,
Kei Hunderl nach mir.

In der Fremd' sein d' Wiena
Und d' Wiena sein harb,
Machen traurige Mienen,
Weil's Muetterli starb.

Liebes Vogerl flieg weiter,
Nimm Gruß mit und Kuß!
Und i kann di nit begleit'n,
Weil i hier bleiben muß.

Many editions from the 19th century seem to go back to Holtei's tradition.

== Children's song ==
The text was changed from around 1911, addressing the mother instead of a beloved, such as in a singspiel for children Johann Lewalter and Georg Schläger:

Kommt ein Vogel geflogen,
setzt sich nieder auf mein' Fuß,
hat ein' Zettel im Schnabel,
von der Mutter ein' Gruß.

Lieber Vogel, fliege weiter,
nimm ein Gruß mit und ein Kuss,
denn ich kann dich nicht begleiten,
weil ich hier bleiben muss.

== Arrangements ==
Siegfried Ochs wrote variations for piano, 'S kommt ein Vogel geflogen im Stile bekannter Meister, imitating the style of composers such as Johann Sebastian Bach, Wolfgang Amadeus Mozart, Ludwig van Beethoven and Richard Wagner. The humorous variations were also arranged for orchestra.
