= Donaulied =

German drinking song about a rape

The Donaulied ("Danube song") is a German song (Lied) that, in most versions, describes the rape of a young woman sleeping on the bank of the Danube. It is frequently sung at festivities as a drinking song.

== Texts ==
The text of the Donaulied is the account of a man who walks along the bank of the Danube, where he finds a young woman sleeping. Depending on the version, he rapes her or he has consensual sex with her as she wakes up.

The earliest known text of the Donaulied was dated to 1850 by Johann Lewalter, who attributed it to the village of Guntershausen. This version went:

German text	Translation
Einst ging ich am Ufer der Donau und fand Ein schlafendes Mädchen im weißem Gewand.	I once walked along the Danube and found A sleeping girl in a white dress.
Da stand ich ganz stille und rührte mich nicht Und schaute ihr immer ins schöne Gesicht.	I stood very still and did not move And gazed steadily into her beautiful face.
Da ward mir auf einmal mein Herzchen so schwer, Da hört ich das Rauschen der Donau nicht mehr.	All of a sudden my little heart became so heavy, All of a sudden I didn't hear the Danube's roar any more.
Und als nun das Mädchen vom Schlafe erwacht, Da war ja das Opfer der Liebe vollbracht.	And once the girl woke up from her sleep, The sacrifice of love had been accomplished.
Dass du wirst mein Weibchen und ich werd dein Mann! Und übrigens geht es die Leute nichts an.	So that you become my little wife and I your husband! And besides, this does not concern anybody else.
Dass du bist mein Weibchen, des bin ich so froh, Das verdanken wir beide ner hüpfenden Floh.	For that you are my little wife, I am so glad, That we both owe to a hopping flea.

A longer version published by Tobias Krummschnabel in 1870 portrays the sex as consensual. Many other versions of the text exist, some of which are very sexually explicit; these versions may date to the First World War. Most portray the encounter as a rape, especially those published prior to 2012. In that year, the Schlager music singer Mickie Krause released an album of party songs including a consensual version of the Donaulied.

One of the cruder versions of the Donaulied, made available in 2020 by the German student Corinna Schütz as part of a petition against sexual violence in songs, has the encounter end like this, after the woman complains that her rapist has made her pregnant and that she can't afford any more children:

German text	Translation
Du saublöde Schlampe, was denkst du von mir Oh oh oh olalala Ich trage doch immer den Gummi bei mir Oh oh oh olalala	You fucking stupid slut, what do you think of me? Oh oh oh olalala I've always got a rubber on me Oh oh oh olalala
Ich steh auf der Brücke und wink mit dem Hut Oh oh oh olalala Hier hast du nen Heller, der Fick der war gut Oh oh oh olalala	I stand on the bridge and wave with my hat Oh oh oh olalala Here's a coin for you, that was a good fuck Oh oh oh olalala
Und die Moral von der Geschicht Oh oh oh olalala Schlafende Mädchen die vögelt man nicht Oh oh oh olalala	And the moral of the story is Oh oh oh olalala Sleeping girls are not for fucking Oh oh oh olalala

== Reception in Germany ==
The Donaulied has been sung "for generations" during festivities in Germany, and is reproduced in song text collections of the Oktoberfest and other beer festivals. It is part of a tradition of sexually explicit drinking songs in Germany, most of which have long been considered insignificant and were not covered by scholars of popular music, except for a brief period of interest in the 1920s.

In May 2020, the Donaulied became the subject of public debate in Germany as the Passau student Corinna Schütz launched an online petition against "beer tent sexism". The petition asked people to stop singing the song because it normalized and glorified sexual violence against women. By 2 June, more than 23,000 people had signed the petition, but Schütz also received death threats and other hate-filled messages in response to her petition.
