= Schweizerisches Volksliedarchiv =

Swiss research institution

The Schweizerische Volksliedarchiv is an institution established at the University of Basel.

It was founded in 1906 as a department of the Schweizerische Gesellschaft für Volkskunde. Under the direction of John Meier, associations and the press were called upon to send in the song collection known in Switzerland so that it could be scientifically and critically reviewed and published in a suitable manner. The appeal was sent to all parts of Switzerland.

As a result of this first call, a collection of 31,000 German-language songs, 3,200 songs from Romandy, 1,400 from Ticino and 1,200 Rhaeto-Romanic has been secured.

The collection was subsequently expanded through bequests. For example, the holdings of Hanns In der Gand, the folk song collection of Arthur Rossat or the estate of Armin Breu with around 400 records and tapes with historical field recordings were added to the archive.

== See also ==
- Deutsches Volksliedarchiv
- Österreichisches Volksliedwerk
