= Arnold Geering =

Swiss musicologist

Arnold Geering (14 May 1902 – 16 December 1982) was a Swiss musicologist and philologist.

Born in Basel, Geering was a son of Traugott Geering and the brother of Walter Geering. He studied musicology and philology at the University of Basel, where he received his doctorate in 1931 and his habilitation in 1947. From 1950 to 1972, he was professor of musicology at the University of Bern. From 1948 to 1951, he was secretary of the International Musicological Society and from 1949 to 1963 director of the Schweizerisches Volksliedarchiv. Geering edited the works of Ludwig Senfl.

Geering died in Vevey at the age of 80.
