= Bielefeld University of Applied Sciences =

Coordinates: 52°02′07.79″N 8°30′11.34″E

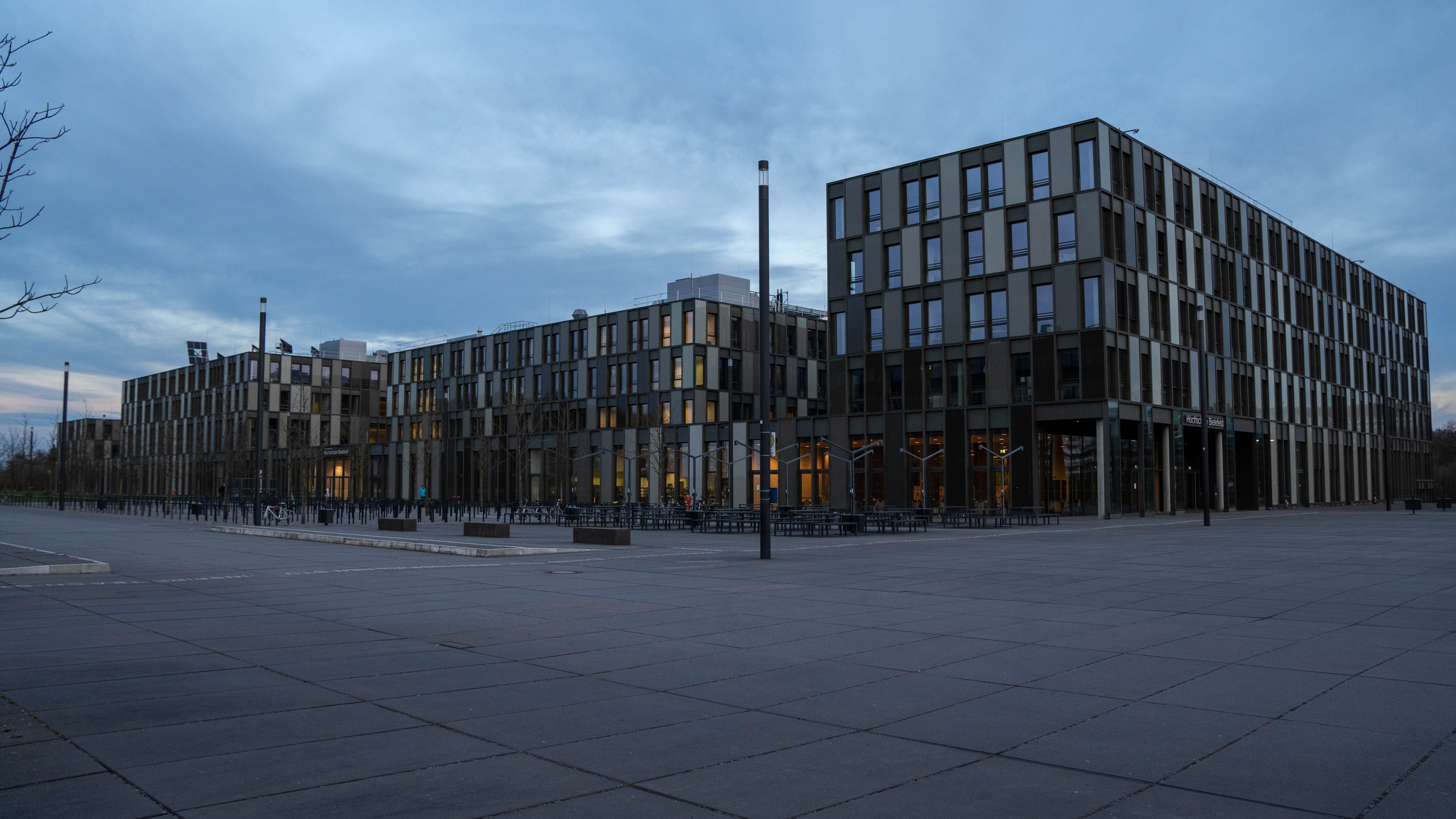
The main building

The Hochschule Bielefeld – University of Applied Sciences and Arts (Fachhochschule Bielefeld) is the second largest education institution in Bielefeld. It divides itself into six faculties (Fachbereiche):

== Divisions ==
- Faculty 1: Design (Gestaltung)

The Faculty of Design is located in a separate building close to the Rudolf-Oetker-Halle as well as a public park called "Bürger Park" (German: citizens' park). Three different branches of design and arts are available to the carefully selected students: "Photography & Media", "Graphic and Communication Design" and "Fashion Design". There are accepted about 25-30 freshmen in each branch per year. The school is rated among the top five of Germany's schools offering a focused education in photography, honoured by the state-funded "Special Research Centre on Photography & Media". The school's photography students are also entitled to compete - among the students of other famous European institutions like the Royal College of Arts London and the École Nationale Supérieure des Arts Décoratifs Paris - in the annual Leica Photography Award.

- Faculty 2: Campus Minden (Architecture, Civil Engineering, Engineering and Computer Science) The Faculty is located in the town of Minden.
- Faculty 3: Engineering and Mathematics
- Faculty 4: Social Sciences
- Faculty 5: Business
- Faculty 6: Health
