= Max Friedlaender (musicologist) =

German bass singer (1852–1934)

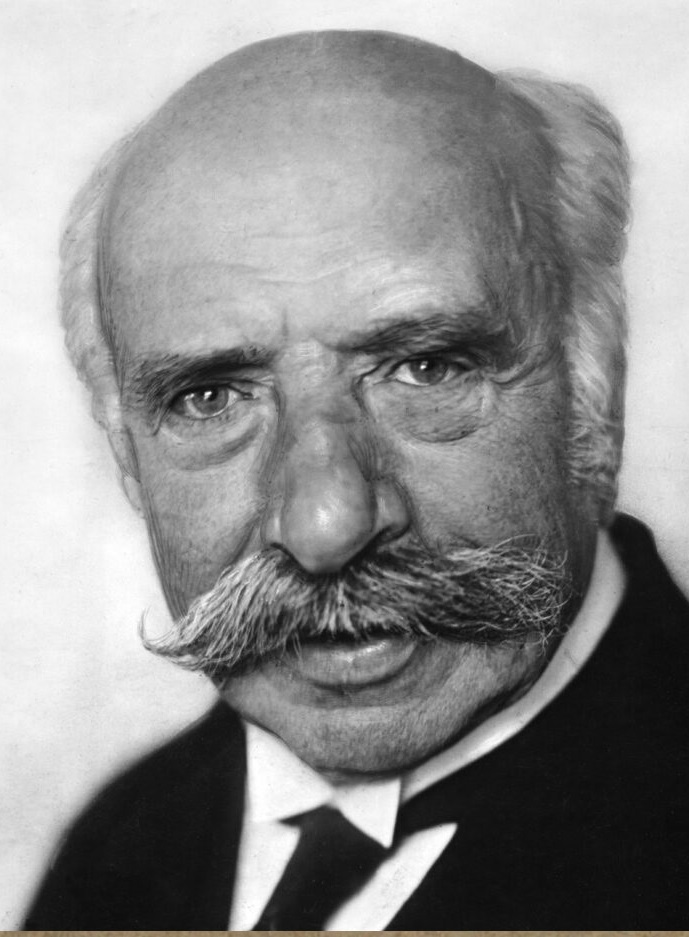
Max Friedlaender (1925)

Max Friedlaender (12 October 1852, Brieg/Brzeg, Province of Silesia, Prussia – 2 May 1934, Berlin) was a German bass singer, music editor, and musicologist. He specialized in German Lieder.

== Life ==
Friedlaender studied voice with well-known teachers Manuel Garcia in London and Julius Stockhausen in Frankfurt, both of the bel-canto school. From 1881 to 1883 the singer lived and worked at Frankfurt, moving to Berlin in 1883. He received a doctorate from the University of Rostock in 1894 with a dissertation on Franz Schubert and joined the music faculty at Berlin University in 1894.

Friedlaender emigrated to America in 1911 where he taught at Harvard University. He succeeded Rochus von Liliencron as general editor for a Book of National Songs for Men's Choirs first proposed by Kaiser Wilhelm II in 1906. In the 1920s, Friedlaender was closely involved in the formation of the Deutsches Volksliedarchiv (German folksong archive). The Nazi regime popularized the archive's work in keeping with its nationalist cultural policies – ironic given Friedlaender's Jewish heritage.

== Works ==
Friedlaender's edited several popular song anthologies for the Leipzig music publisher CF Peters including works by Robert Schumann, Felix Mendelssohn, Carl Loewe, Ludwig van Beethoven, seven volumes of Schubert songs, a collection of folk songs, and a "Choral Manual." Some of these editions are still in print today. In his researches, Friedlaender discovered several previously unknown songs by Schubert. His magnum opus is a two-volume study of German song in the 18th century (Cotta, Stuttgart 1902).

== Literary works ==
- 1885: 100 Deutsche Volkslieder (100 German folk songs)
- "Gluck's Klopstocksche Oden" (1886); (Gluck's Klopstock Ode)
- "Ein Hundert Deutsche Volkslieder" (1886); (100 German folksongs)
- 1887: Beiträge zur Biographie Franz Schuberts; (Schubert Biographical Researches)
- "Beethoven's Schottische Lieder" (1889); (Beethoven's Scottish Songs)
- "Chorschule" (1891); (Choral Manual)
- "Wiegenlieder" (1894); (Cradle songs)
- "Gesänge von Beethoven" (1896); (Songs of Beethoven)
- "Goethe's Gedichte in der Musik" (1896); (Goethe's poems in Music)
- "Haydn's Canons" (1899);
- "Beethoven's Klavier-Rondo" (1900);
- 1902: Das deutsche Lied im 18. Jahrhundert, 2 vols. (The German song in the 18th century)
