= Sankt Martin (song) =

Christian hymn

- Christian hymn
- Occasion: St. Martin's Day
- Language: German
- Published: 1904

"Sankt Martin" is a traditional Christian hymn and Volkslied for St. Martin's Day, narrating a legendary episode from the life of Martin of Tours. The authors of text and melody are unknown; it was first published in 1904. It is mostly sung for lantern processions on or around the feast day. The popular song has appeared in German hymnals and songbooks, especially for children and young people. It is also known by its first line Sankt Martin ritt durch Schnee und Wind (Saint Martin rode through snow and wind).

== History ==
"Sankt Martin" is a Christian hymn and Volkslied for St. Martin's Day, narrating a legendary episode from the life of Martin of Tours in the 4th cantury. The authors of text and melody are unknown. It is sung for traditional lantern processions on or around the feast day.

It first appeared in a collection Liederschatz für katholische Vereinigungen aller Art in 1904, originally in 20 stanzas. The popular song has appeared in German hymnals and songbooks, especially for children and young people, but most often only rendering the first four stanzas. It is part of the 2013 German hymnal Gotteslob as GL 545, in eight stanzas.
