= Hohe Tannen weisen die Sterne =

German Volkslied

- Volkslied
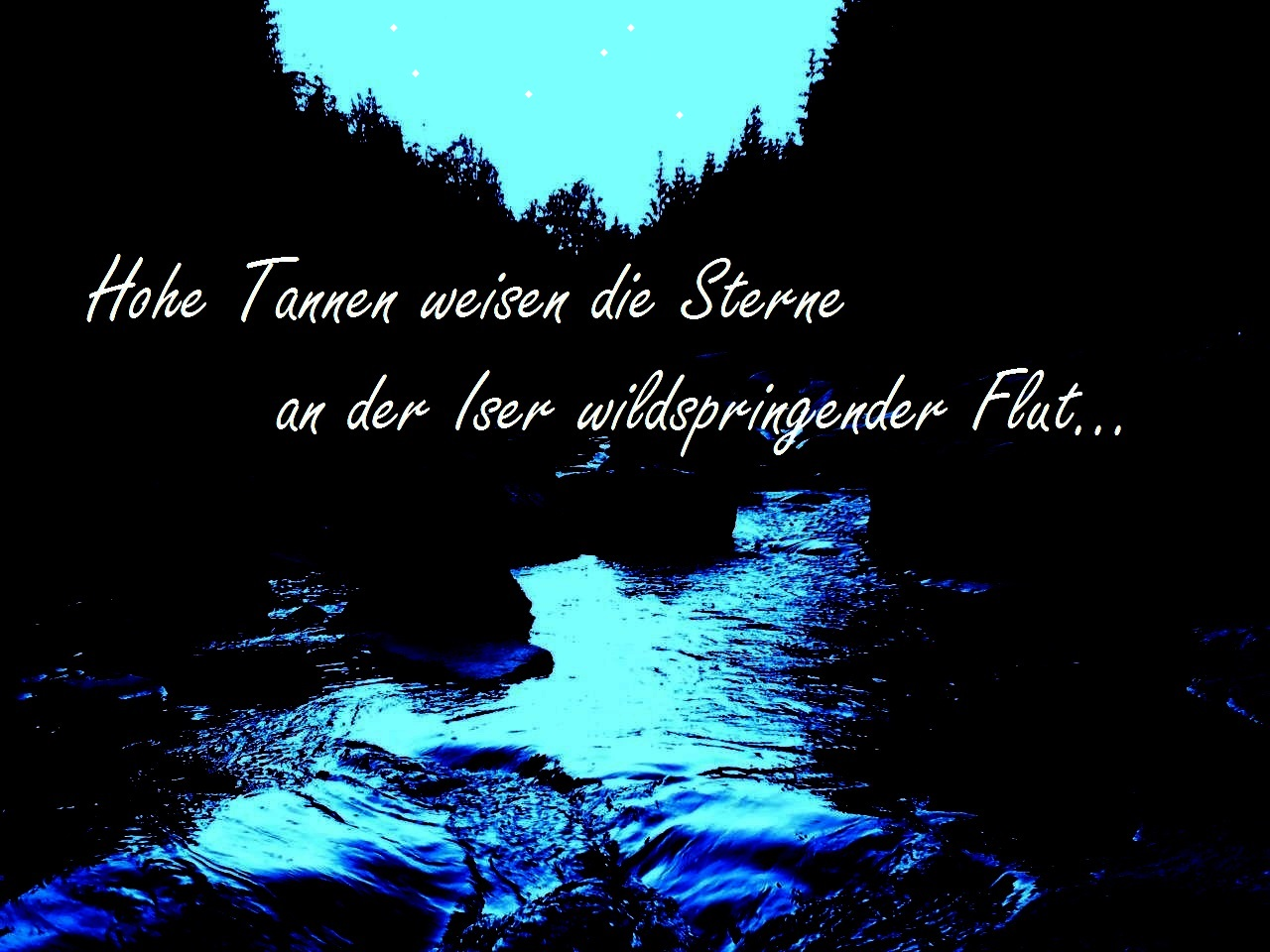
- English: High firs lead the stars
- Other name: hymn of Sudetenland; Rübezahl song
- Composed: 18th century
- Published: 1923

"Hohe Tannen weisen die Sterne" (High firs lead the stars) is a Volkslied from Silesia, first published by a boy scouts group in 1923. It is also known as the unofficial hymn of Sudetenland, and as the Rübezahl song. Modyfied, it is still used by youth groups, published in Die Mundorgel and other collections.

== History ==
The text of "Hohe Tannen weisen die Sterne" was first published 1923 by the Bund deutscher Ringpfadfinder, a boy scout group, in a magazine named Jugendland. The melody is based on "Wahre Freundschaft soll nicht wanken" (True friendship shall not waver), a song from Franconia from the 18th century that Hoffmann von Fallersleben and Ernst Richter published in 1842 in their collection Schlesische Volkslieder mit Melodien (Silesian folk songs with melodies). The composer is unknown.

The text refers to mountains with high fir trees, commonly thought to mean the Silesian Riesengebirge, where the Iser springs, which rather points at Bohemia. It addressed Rübezahl, a regional mountain spirit, as a protector of the missed far-away home country. Rübezahl is invited to join the group singing around a fire, to consider the unfree home country and to end strife and discord.

A few years after the first print, the last line was changed because it was regarded as too militant, from "unser Waffengang des Lebens geweiht" (dedicated to our battle of life) to "sei der Gang unsres Lebens geweiht (dedicated to the course of our life).

In the 1984 Die Mundorgel version, changes included reference to the boy scouts' camp rather than the home country, and dropping the final stanza, besides minor wording changes.

== Text ==
First edition 1923

Hohe Tannen weisen die Sterne
An der Iser in schäumender Flut.
Liegt die Heimat auch in weiter Ferne,
Doch du, Rübezahl, hütest sie gut.

Hast dich uns auch zu eigen gegeben,
Der die Sagen und Märchen erspinnt,
Und im tiefsten Waldesfrieden,
Die Gestalt eines Riesen annimmt.

Komm zu uns an das lodernde Feuer,
An die Berge bei stürmischer Nacht.
Schütz die Zelte, die Heimat, die teure,
Komm und halte bei uns treu die Wacht.

Höre, Rübezahl, lass dir sagen:
Volk und Heimat sind nimmermehr frei.
Schwing die Keule wie in alten Tagen,
Schlage Hader und Zwietracht entzwei.

Weiße Blume im Lichte da droben
Träume weiter vom wilden Streit
Denn Dir Blume ist im Ring da droben
Unser Waffengang des Lebens geweiht.

Mundorgel 1984

Hohe Tannen weisen die Sterne
an der Iser wildspringender Flut;
liegt das Lager auch in weiter Ferne,
doch du, Rübezahl, hütest es gut.

Hast dich uns zu eigen gegeben,
der die Sagen und Märchen erspinnt
und im tiefsten Waldesleben
als ein Riese Gestalt annimmt.

Komm zu uns ans lodernde Feuer,
in die Berge bei stürmischer Nacht!
Schirm die Zelte, die Heimat, die teure,
komm und halte mit uns treue Wacht!

Höre, Rübezahl, was wir dir sagen:
Volk und Heimat, die sind nicht mehr frei!
Schwing die Keule wie in alten Tagen,
schlage Hader und Zwietracht entzwei!
