= Jürgen Oberschelp =

German teacher and choir director

- Born: 12 July 1938 (age 86); Bielefeld
- Education: University of Cologne
- Occupations: Teacher; Choral conductor
- Organizations: Max-Planck-Gymnasium; Bielefelder Kinderchor
- Parent: Friedrich Oberschelp

Jürgen Oberschelp (born 12 July 1938) is a German conductor, choir director. He conducted the Bielefelder Kinderchor, a mixed children's choir that his father had founded in 1932, from 1984 to 2016.

== Life ==
Oberschelp was born in Bielefeld. After studying musicology, geography and music education in Cologne, Mainz and Vienna, Oberschelp received his doctorate in 1972 in Cologne with the dissertation Das öffentliche Musikleben der Stadt Bielefeld im 19. Jahrhundert, about public musical life in Bielefeld in the 19th century. He taught music and geography at the Max-Planck-Gymnasium in Bielefeld from 1971 to 2002, when he retired as Oberstudienrat.

In the 1960s, he took over the direction of the Bielefelder Kinderchor, which his father Friedrich Oberschelp had founded in 1932 as the first mixed children's choir in Germany. He organised many concerts and toured in Germany and abroad. He retired in 2016.

== Publications ==
- Das öffentliche Musikleben der Stadt Bielefeld im 19. Jahrhundert. Bosse, Regensburg 1972 (zugleich: Köln, Univ., Philos. Fak., Diss. 1972); ISBN 3-7649-2575-2
- Das Verschwinden der Kunst in der "Kunst des Zitats". Versuch über Popästhetik in den 80er Jahren. Univ., Diss., Bielefeld 1991

== Recordings ==
As choral conductor with the Bielefelder Kinderchor:

- Lieder zur Winter- und Weihnachtszeit. Ariola-Eurodisc, Gütersloh / Munich 1980
- Jetzt kommen die lustigen Tage. Ariola-Eurodisc, Gütersloh / Munich 1980
- Die schönsten europäischen Volkslieder. Ariola-Eurodisc, Gütersloh / Munich 1981
- Das grosse Jubiläumskonzert. 50 Jahre Bielefelder Kinderchor. Ariola-Eurodisc, Gütersloh / Munich 1982
- 75 Jahre Bielefelder Kinderchor
