= Es tönen die Lieder =

German round about spring

- Round
- English: The songs are ringing
- Language: German
- Composed: 19th century
- Published: 1869
- "Es tönen die Lieder" As a round in three parts, and as a crab canon

"Es tönen die Lieder" (The songs are ringing) is a popular round for three parts to a German text, about songs sounding when spring returns. The author(s) of text and melody are unknown and it was passed orally. It was first published in a 1869 collection. It became a Volkslied, contained in many songbooks.

== History ==
"Es tönen die Lieder" is a round for three parts; it can also be sung as a crab canon. The author and composer are not known but it is believed to have been created in the 19th century. The text describes how songs, and tunes played by shepherds on a shawm, greet the returning spring. It was passed on orally until it was published in 1869, after it had been found in the estate of the gymnast and educator Adolf Spieß. He had developed a series of steps to the music for school gymnastics, first performed in 1853.

In 1937, the Swiss songbook Basler Singbuch published the song, marked "volkstümlich" (traditional), with three additional stanzas and an instrumental ornamented part by the music teacher Walter Simon Huber (1898–1978), the father of composer Klaus Huber. The second stanza of his version describes finches in their nests, the third bees, and the last larks, ending with thanks to the Creator. The following 1943 edition of the songbook omitted his additions, but they were retained in other collections aimed at school singing.

It became a popular Volkslied, included in many songbooks. The beginning was the title of a 2021 series in five parts of the broadcaster SWR about music for spring.

== Text ==
Es tönen die Lieder,
Der Frühling kehrt wieder,
es spielet der Hirte
auf seiner Schalmei.
La la la ...

The songs are a'ringing,
and Spring is returning,
the shepherd is playing
on his shawm.

== Melody ==
=== Quodlibet ===
The round can be combined in a quodlibet with two other rounds, "C-a-f-f-e-e" and "Heut kommt der Hans zu mir". In 1958, Fritz Bachmann published a quodlibet adding to these three also the song "Hab' mein' Wage vollgelade" which is not a round. The arrangement appeared in the youth collection Leben Singen Kämpfen. Liederbuch der deutschen Jugend., which was printed by the council of the Free German Youth in East Berlin.
