= Ernst Klusen =

German musicologist, educator and composer (1909–1988)

- Born: 20 February 1909; Duisburg, Germany
- Died: 31 July 1988 (aged 79); Bad Segeberg, Germany
- Occupations: German musicologist, educator and composer

Ernst Klusen (20 February 1909 in Düsseldorf – 31 July 1988 in Bad Segeberg) was a German musicologist, educator and Volkslied composer.

== Work ==
=== Books and songbooks ===
- Das Volkslied im niederrheinischen Dorf. Studien zum Volksliedschatz der Gemeinde Hinsbeck mit besonderer Berücksichtigung der Melodien. Voggenreiter Verlag, Potsdam 1941.
- Der Stammescharakter in den Weisen neuerer deutscher Volkslieder. Voggenreiter, Bad Godesberg 1953.
- Die Windmühle. Niederrheinische Volkslieder. Voggenreiter, Bad Godesberg 1955.
- Sankt Martin. Lieder und Lampen. Voggenreiter, Bad Godesberg 1955.
- Das Bonner Gesangbuch von 1550. Edited by Ernst Klusen. Staufen-Verlag, Kamp-Lintfort 1965.
- Volkslied. Fund und Erfindung. Gerig, Cologne 1969.
- Das Volkslied im niederrheinischen Dorf. Studien zum Lebensbereich des Volksliedes der Gemeinde Hinsbeck im Wandel einer Generation. Voggenreiter, Bonn-Bad Godesberg 1970.
- Bevorzugte Liedtypen Zehn- bis Vierzehnjähriger. Gerig, Cologne 1971.
- Gefahr und Elend einer neuen Musikdidaktik. Gerig, Cologne 1973.
- Zur Situation des Singens in der Bundesrepublik Deutschland. Part 1: Der Umgang mit dem Lied (Mitarbeit: V. Karbusický). Gerig, Cologne 1974.
- Zur Situation des Singens in der Bundesrepublik Deutschland. Part 2: Die Lieder (Mitarbeit: V. Karbusický). Gerig, Cologne 1975, ISBN 3-87252-097-0.
- Johann Wilhelm Wilms. Leben und Werk. Knuf, Buren 1975.
- Kritische Lieder der 70er Jahre. Fischer, Frankfurt/M 1978, ISBN 3-596-22950-2.
- Volkslieder aus 500 Jahren. Fischer, Frankfurt 1978, ISBN 3-596-22951-0.
- Das Musikleben der Stadt Krefeld 1780–1945. A. Volk, Cologne 1979/80.
- Deutsche Lieder. Texte und Melodien. Insel, Frankfurt/M 1980, ISBN 3-458-04855-2.
- Gevaren van de nieuwere muziekdidaktiek. Muusses, Purmerend 1980, ISBN 90-231-8131-X.
- Elektronische Medien und musikalische Laienaktivität. Gerig, Cologne 1980, ISBN 3-87252-117-9.
- Die schönsten Kinderlieder und Kinderreime. Naumann and Göbel, Cologne 1987, ISBN 3-625-10721-X.
- Singen. Materialien zu einer Theorie. Bosse. Regensburg 1989, ISBN 3764923369.

=== Compositions ===
- Dialect song arrangements for choir: Et Paterke, Het Quieselche, Wenn’t Kirmes is
- 3 String quartets
- Double Concerto for cello, bassoon and orchestra
- Oratorio for solos, choir and large orchestra
- Triludium II for guitar, violoncello and flute

== Bibliography ==
- Rudolf Adrians: Ernst Klusen (Heimatverein Viersen. Jahreskarte.). Heimatverein Viersen, Viersen 1999 (online, PDF; 87261,32 KB).
- Karl-Hans Bonzelett, Werner Tillmann: Ernst Klusen 1909–1988. Das Volkslied als Lebensauftrag. In Heimatbuch des Kreises Viersen. Vol. 60, 2009 (2008), ISSN 0948-6631, p. 56–63 (inline, PDF; 131,68 KB).
- Günther Noll: Ernst Klusen – 70 Jahre. In Ad marginem. Randbemerkungen zur europäischen Musikethnologie. Nr. 42, 1979, ISSN 0001-7965 (online, PDF; 81,84 KB).
- Günther Noll, Marianne Bröcker (editors): Musikalische Volkskunde – aktuell. Festschrift für Ernst Klusen zum 75. Geburtstag. Wegener, Bonn 1984, ISBN 3-921285-43-7.
- Wilhelm Schepping: Nachruf Ernst Klusen (1909–1988). In Jahrbuch für Volksliedforschung. Jg. 34, 1989, p. 120–123 (JSTOR 849196).
- Wolfgang Schmidt: Dr. Ernst Klusen verstorben. In Der Niederrhein. Nr. 4/1988. Krefeld 1988, ISSN 0342-5673.
- Wilhelm Schepping: Volkslied als Auftrag. Leben und Werk Ernst Klusens. In: Günther Noll, Wilhelm Schepping (Hrsg.): Musikalische Volkskultur in der Stadt der Gegenwart. Tagungsbericht Köln 1988 der Kommission für Lied-, Musik- und Tanzforschung in der Deutschen Gesellschaft für Volkskunde e.V. Metzler, Hannover 1992, ISBN 3-8156-3358-3, p. 209–219.
