= Männerwasser =

River in Germany

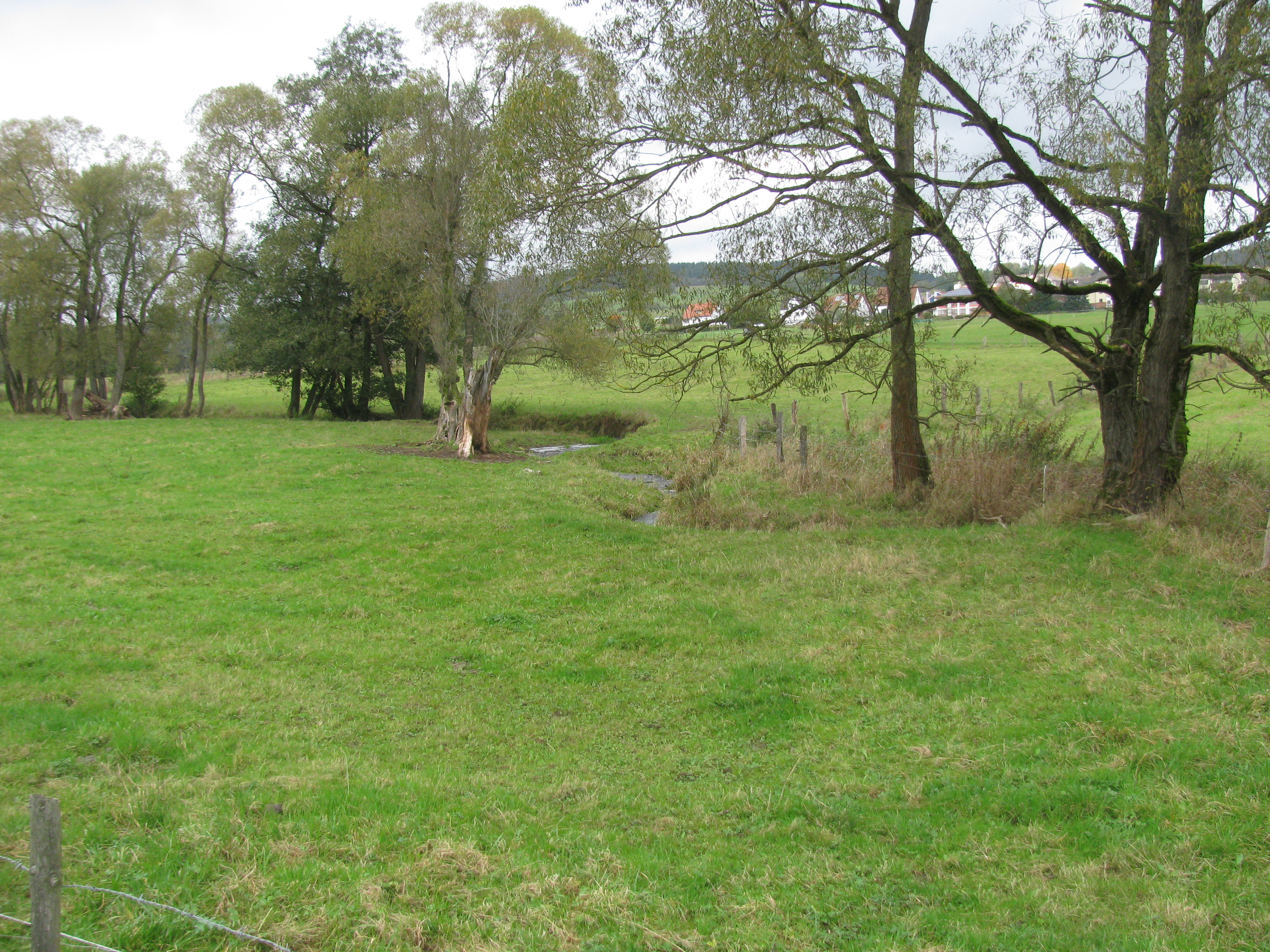

Location
- Country: Germany
- States: Hesse

Physical characteristics
- Mouth
  - location: Losse
  - coordinates: 51.2254°N 9.6704°E

Basin features
- Progression: Losse→ Fulda→ Weser→ North Sea

Männerwasser is a river of Hesse, Germany. It flows into the Losse near Helsa.

It originates in the Geo-Nature Park Frau-Holle-Land (Werratal.Meißner.Kaufunger Wald) in the wooded Söhre region. Its source is located in the municipality of Söhrewald, between the Franzosentriesch (approximately 490 meters above sea level) in the southwest and the Kleiner Belgerkopf (approximately 490 meters) in the northeast, near the abandoned village of Lobesrode at an altitude of about 458 meters.

== See also ==
- List of rivers of Hesse
