= Volkslied =

German genre of popular songs

Volkslied (literally: folk song) is a genre of popular songs in German which are traditionally sung. While many of them were first passed orally, several collections were published from the late 18th century. Later, some popular songs were also included in this classification.

== History ==
The earliest songs in German appeared in the 12th century. Art songs were created by minstrels and meistersinger while cantastoria (Bänkelsänger) sang songs in public that were orally transmitted. Song collections were written from the late 15th century, such as Lochamer-Liederbuch and Glogauer Liederbuch. Georg Forster's Frische teutsche Liedlein was first printed in 1536.

In the period of Sturm und Drang, poets and authors became interested in that which they saw as simple, close to nature, original, and unspoiled (nach dem Einfachen, Naturnahen, Ursprünglichen und Unverfälschten). Johann Gottfried Herder coined the term 'Volkslied' in the late 18th century, and published Von deutscher Art und Kunst (On German ways and artistry) in 1771. In 1778/79, a collection Volkslieder was published, promoted by Johann Wolfgang von Goethe and Gotthold Ephraim Lessing, which mentioned neither an editor nor authors, in an attempt to suggest the songs as an expression of the soul of the people (Äußerungen der Volksseele). Friedrich Silcher (1789–1860) composed a great number of Lieder, many of which became Volkslieder, and he edited collections of Volkslieder.

In the middle of the 18th century, the Berliner Liederschule promoted songs with simple melodies im Volkston (i.e. in the Volkslied style). Songs written following the concept include "Das Wandern ist des Müllers Lust" and "O Täler weit, o Höhen".

In the early 20th century, the repertoire was broadened by workers' songs and students' songs. In 1914, John Meier founded the Deutsches Volksliedarchiv, a research and archive of Volkslied. The Wandervogel movement turned to singing while wandering, with the collection Der Zupfgeigenhansl published in 1909, and reprinted until 1933.

== Collections ==
- Achim von Arnim, Clemens Brentano: Des Knaben Wunderhorn. 1806/1808.
- Andreas Kretzschmer, Anton Wilhelm von Zuccalmaglio: Deutsche Volkslieder mit ihren Originalweisen. 2 vols. Berlin 1838/1841.
- Rochus Freiherr von Liliencron: Die historischen Volkslieder der Deutschen vom 13. bis 16. Jahrhundert. 5 vols. Leipzig 1865–1869, reprographied reprint 1966.
- Ludwig Erk, Franz Magnus Böhme: Deutscher Liederhort. Leipzig 1893/1894.
- August Linder: Deutsche Weisen – Die beliebtesten Volks- und geistlichen Lieder für Klavier (with text), ca. 1900
- Hans Breuer (ed.): Der Zupfgeigenhansl Melody edition with chords. Reprint of the 10th edition, Leipzig 1913 (ED 3586). Schott, Mainz 1983, ISBN 3-7957-4002-9.
- Bertold Marohl, Der neue Zupfgeigenhansl, 121 young Lieder with texts, melodies, numbered chords and a einer finger positions for guitar. Mainz (et al.), Schott 1983 ISBN 978-3-7957-2062-9
- Klemens Neumann, Der Spielmann – Liederbuch für Jugend und Volk, Matthias Grünewald Verlag Mainz; 1st ed. 1914 [(katholische) Quickborn Bewegung], with many expanded reprints, certainly up to 1976
- Fritz Sotke, Unsere Lieder – Ein Liederbuch für die wandernde Jugend; Sauerland Verlag, Iserlohn, 1st ed. 1921.
- Hermann Böse, Das Volkslied für Heim und Wanderung; Arbeiterjugend Verlag Berlin, 1st ed. 1922, reprints 1923, 1927.
- Louis Pinck: Verklingende Weisen. Lothringischer Verlags- und Hilfsverein, Metz 1926 (vol. 1).
- Hermann Peter Gehricke, Hugo Moser, Alfred Quellmalz, Karl Vötterle, Bruder Singer, Lieder unseres Volkes; Bährenreiter Edition 1250, Kassel 1951; 1974 new ed.
- Heiner Wolf, Unser fröhlicher Gesell, Ein Liederbuch für alle Tage, Möseler Verlag Wolfenbüttel \ Voggenreiter Verlag Bad Godesberg, 1955, reprints at least until 1964
- Josef Gregor, Friedrich Klausmeier, Egon Kraus: Europäische Lieder in den Ursprachen. Vol. 1: Die romanischen und germanischen Sprachen, Berlin 1957.
- Ernst Klusen: Das Mühlrad, Ein Liederbuch der Heimat, Kempen\Niederrhein 1966
- Klusen: Volkslieder aus 500 Jahren – Texte und Noten mit Begleitakkorden. Fischer, Frankfurt 1978.
- Klusen: Deutsche Lieder. Texts und melodies. Insel, Frankfurt/M. 1980, ISBN 3-458-04855-2.
- Willy Schneider: Deutsche Weisen – Die beliebtesten Volkslieder für Klavier mit Text. Lausch & Zweigle, Stuttgart 1958.
- Wolfgang Steinitz: Deutsche Volkslieder demokratischen Charakters aus 6 Jahrhunderten. 2 vols, Berlin 1953, 1956.
- Klingende Brücke: Liederatlas europäischer Sprachen der Klingenden Brücke. Vol. 1: Bonn 2001, vol. 2: Bonn 2002, vol. 3: Bonn 2003, vol. 4: Bonn 2006

== Volkslieder ==
- Ach, wie ist's möglich dann
- Alle Vögel sind schon da
- Als der Großvater die Großmutter nahm
- Ännchen von Tharau
- Auf der Lüneburger Heide
- Backe, backe Kuchen
- Bolle reiste jüngst zu Pfingsten
- Bunt sind schon die Wälder
- Das Wandern ist des Müllers Lust
- Der Kuckuck und der Esel
- Der Mond ist aufgegangen
- Der treue Husar
- Die Gedanken sind frei
- Drei Chinesen mit dem Kontrabass
- Du, du liegst mir im Herzen
- Ein Heller und ein Batzen
- Es tönen die Lieder
- Geh aus, mein Herz, und suche Freud
- De Hamborger Veermaster
- Hänschen klein
- Heidenröslein to the 1829 melody by Heinrich Werner
- Hohe Tannen weisen die Sterne
- Ich hab die Nacht geträumet
- In einem kühlen Grunde
- Innsbruck, ich muss dich lassen
- Kein schöner Land in dieser Zeit
- Kommt ein Vogel geflogen
- Leise rieselt der Schnee
- Muss i denn zum Städtele hinaus
- Nun ruhen alle Wälder
- Nun will der Lenz uns grüßen
- O alte Burschenherrlichkeit
- O Tannenbaum
- Sankt Martin ritt durch Schnee und Wind
- Stille Nacht, heilige Nacht
- Weißt du, wie viel Sternlein stehen

== See also ==
- Soldatenlied (Soldier's song)
