= John Meier (folklorist) =

German folklorist (1864–1953)

John Meier (14 June 1864 – 3 May 1953) was a German folklorist and philologist. He founded both the (Deutsches Volksliedarchiv, DVA) and also the Swiss Volksliedarchiv.

Meier was born in Vahr, a part of Bremen, and died in Freiburg at the age of 88.

== Career ==
Meier studied German, Romance and English philology, history and anthropology at the Universities in Freiburg im Breisgau and Tübingen. In 1888 he obtained his doctorate at Freiburg with the Dissertation Researches concerning the poet and the language of the 'Iolande' . In 1891 there followed his formal faculty admission to the University of Halle with the work Studies in the Linguistic and Literary History of the Rhinelands in the Middle Ages.

In the years which followed this, he busied himself intensively with folk-song investigations, and put forward his thesis of Sunken Cultural Patrimony. In 1899 he became professor in ordinary for German philology at the Basel University and concerned himself principally with a systematic collection of folk-songs. Between 1905 and 1912 he was Overseer for the Swiss Society for Folk-studies. In 1906 he founded the Swiss Folk-song archive. From 1911 he became president of the Council of the German Congress for Folk-studies. In 1912 he became professor in ordinary for folk-studies at Freiburg. In 1914 he founded there the German Folk-song Archive. In the 1920s he was working with Max Friedlaender and Johann Bolte on the German song archive.

From 1935 he published a collection of German folk-songs with critical commentaries: the annual Journal for Folk-Song Publication. With hindsight the subject, insofar as it from 1933 to 1945 reflected the interests of National-socialist ideology, is governed by no absolute Science. One can say that Meier began the work towards scientific standards in Folk-studies. It was for this that, at the Fifth German Folk-Studies Congress in 1938, he appealed to the intelligence and collective understanding of the delegates. In his role as Chairman of the convention, he found himself - especially in view of the threats of the Rosenberg party - forced to cooperate with the Ahnenerbe of the SS. In 1948 he abdicated from the role of congress leader. He retained the directorship of the German Folk-song Archive for the Baden-Württemberg region.

== Prizes and Honours ==
- 1934 Goethe-Medal for Art and Science
- 1952 National Prize of the German Democratic Republic
- 1952 Bundes Service Cross

== Works ==
- The German soldier-songs in the field. Straßburg 1916 (Trübners Library Vol. 4)
- Folk-song studies. Straßburg 1917 (Trübners Library Vol. 8)
- German soldier-speech. (Karlsruhe 1917)
- Goethe, Freiherr vom Stein and German folk-study. Past, present and future. (1926)

== Sources ==
- Neue Deutsche Biographie Vol. 16, p. 643-644.

== See also ==
- List of folk song collections
