= Nun will der Lenz uns grüßen =

Volkslied

- Volkslied
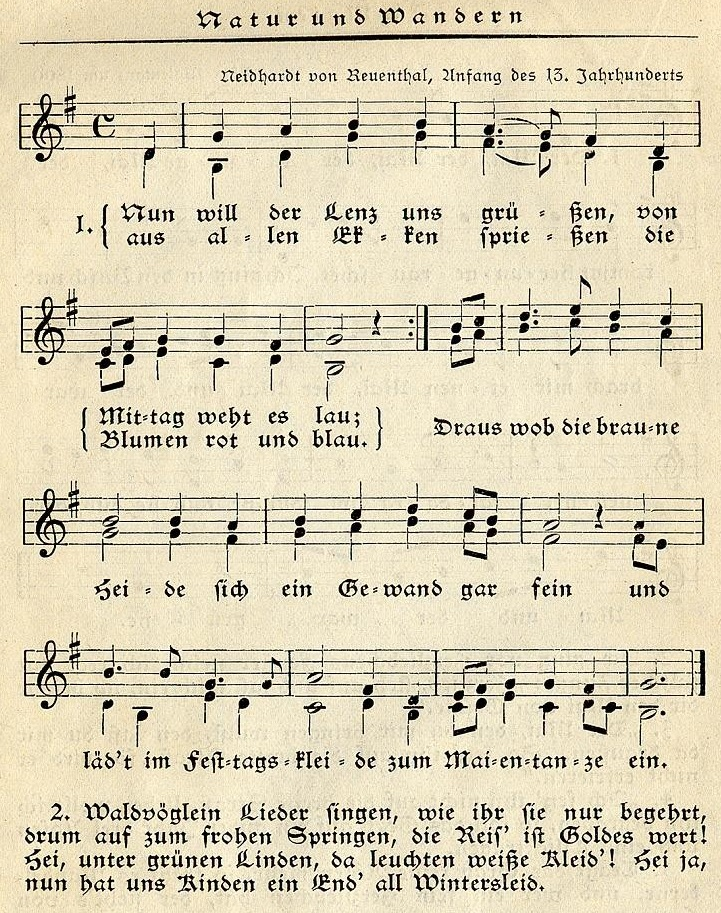
- Text and melody in 1926
- English: Now Spring wants to greet us
- Written: 1878
- Text: by Karl Ströse
- Melody: by Gustav Weber
- Composed: 1886

"Nun will der Lenz uns grüßen" (Now Spring wants to greet us) is a spring song in German. The text was written by Karl Ströse as a free transcription of a medieval poem by Neidhart von Reuental. It was published with a shortened text and a different folk melody and a four-part setting by Gustav Weber in 1886 in Switzerland, giving Neidhart von Reuental as the author. This version became a popular Volkslied in German-speaking countries when the Wandervogel movement (1915) and the Jugendbewegung of the 1920s distributed it. It has remained popular.

== History ==
Ströse published a poem collection in 1878, Deutsche Minne aus alter Zeit – ausgewählte Lieder der Minnesänger des Mittelalters, presenting medieval poems in his free transcription. Three of the poems are by Neidhart von Reuental which Ströse entitled Tanzweisen (dancing songs), including "Diu zît ist hie" (The time is there) which he paraphrased as "Nun will der Lenz uns grüßen". All three Tanzweisen were set to music by Carl August Fischer for voice and piano and published in Bremen in 1885. "Nun will der Lenz uns grüßen" has five stanzas of four lines each. These songs were not widely distributed.

The Swiss composer Gustav Weber used an anonymous melody for the poem instead and wrote a four-part setting, published in 1886 by the Zürcher Liederbuchanstalt. The melody is reminiscent of the 17th-century folk melody "Wilhelmus van Nassouwe", now the Dutch national anthem. The text was shortened, combining two stanzas to one and omitting one of the five. Neidhart von Reuenthal was given as the author. This version was initially only sung by choirs, but was included in song books of the Wandervogel movement in 1915, and was further distributed by the 1920s Jugendbewegung (youth movement), for example in 1926 in the collection for young people Was singet und klinget. Lieder der Jugend, where Neidhart von Reuenthal was again credited as author. The song, believed to have a tradition of centuries, became popular then.

After World War II, "Nun will der Lenz uns grüßen" remained a Volkslied of wide distribution and many recordings, one of the leading Volkslieder in both East and West Germany. The song title has been used as the title of collections of spring songs. The song has featured in recordings of the 21st century such as Bube Dame König in their 2015 album Traumländlein.
