= Losse (river) =

River in Germany

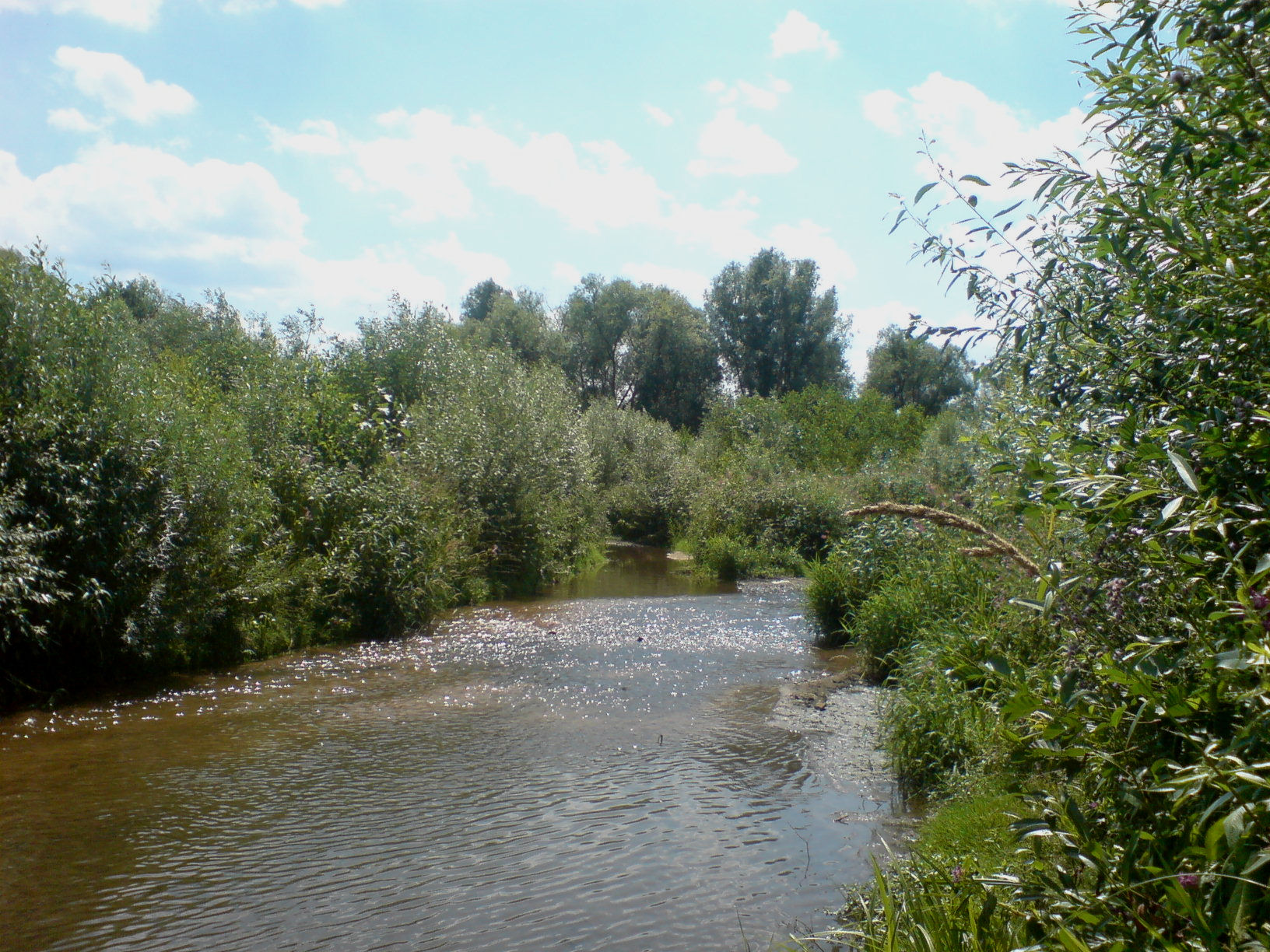

Location
- Country: Germany
- State: Hesse

Physical characteristics
- Mouth
  - location: Fulda in Kassel
  - coordinates: 51.322°N 9.537°E
- Length: 29.0 km (18.0 mi)

Basin features
- Progression: Fulda→ Weser→ North Sea

The Losse (German pronunciation: [ˈlɔsə]) is a river of Hesse, Germany. It is a right tributary of the Fulda, which it joins in Kassel. It flows through Hessisch Lichtenau and Kaufungen.

== See also ==
- List of rivers of Hesse
