= Siegfried Ochs =

German choral conductor and composer

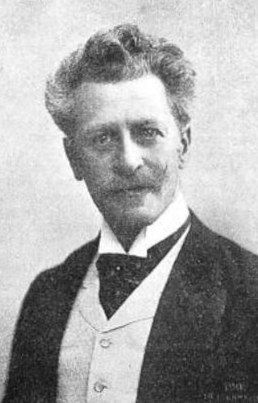
- In The Musician, January 1909
- Born: 19 April 1858; Free City of Frankfurt
- Died: 6 February 1929 (aged 70); Berlin, Weimar Republic
- Education: Polytechnikum Darmstadt; Ruprecht Karl University of Heidelberg; Königliche Hochschule für Musik
- Occupations: Composer; Choral conductor

Siegfried Ochs (19 April 1858 – 6 February 1929) was a German choral conductor and composer.

== Life ==
Born in Frankfurt to Jewish parents, Ochs first studied medicine and chemistry at the Polytechnikum Darmstadt (today the Technische Universität Darmstadt) and at the Ruprecht Karl University of Heidelberg. He later devoted himself entirely to music, studying at the Königliche Hochschule für Musik, Berlin, under Schultze and Ernst Rudorff, and later privately under Friedrich Kiel and Heinrich Urban. In 1882, Ochs founded the Philharmonischer Chor Berlin (Philharmonic Choral Society of Berlin), which he would lead until 1920. At first an obscure organization, it became prominent through numerous performances given by Hans von Bülow, an intimate friend of Ochs. It arguably became the greatest choral society in Berlin and was distinguished for its helpful patronage of young musicians, whose compositions were performed for the first time. The choral society continues operations to present day.

Ochs died in Berlin.

== Works ==
Ochs was noted for humorous or parodic compositions. He wrote both the libretto and music of the three-act comic opera Im Namen des Gesetzes (Hamburg, 1888), two operettas, duets for soprano and alto, male choruses, vocal canons, and several books of songs. Many musicologists also maintain that Ochs was both composer and lyricist of the aria Dank sei Dir, Herr, still widely believed to be by Handel.
