= Deutsches Volksliedarchiv =

German research institute

Coordinates: 47°59′54″N 7°50′42″E

Deutsche Volksliedarchiv Zentrum für Populäre Kultur und Musik
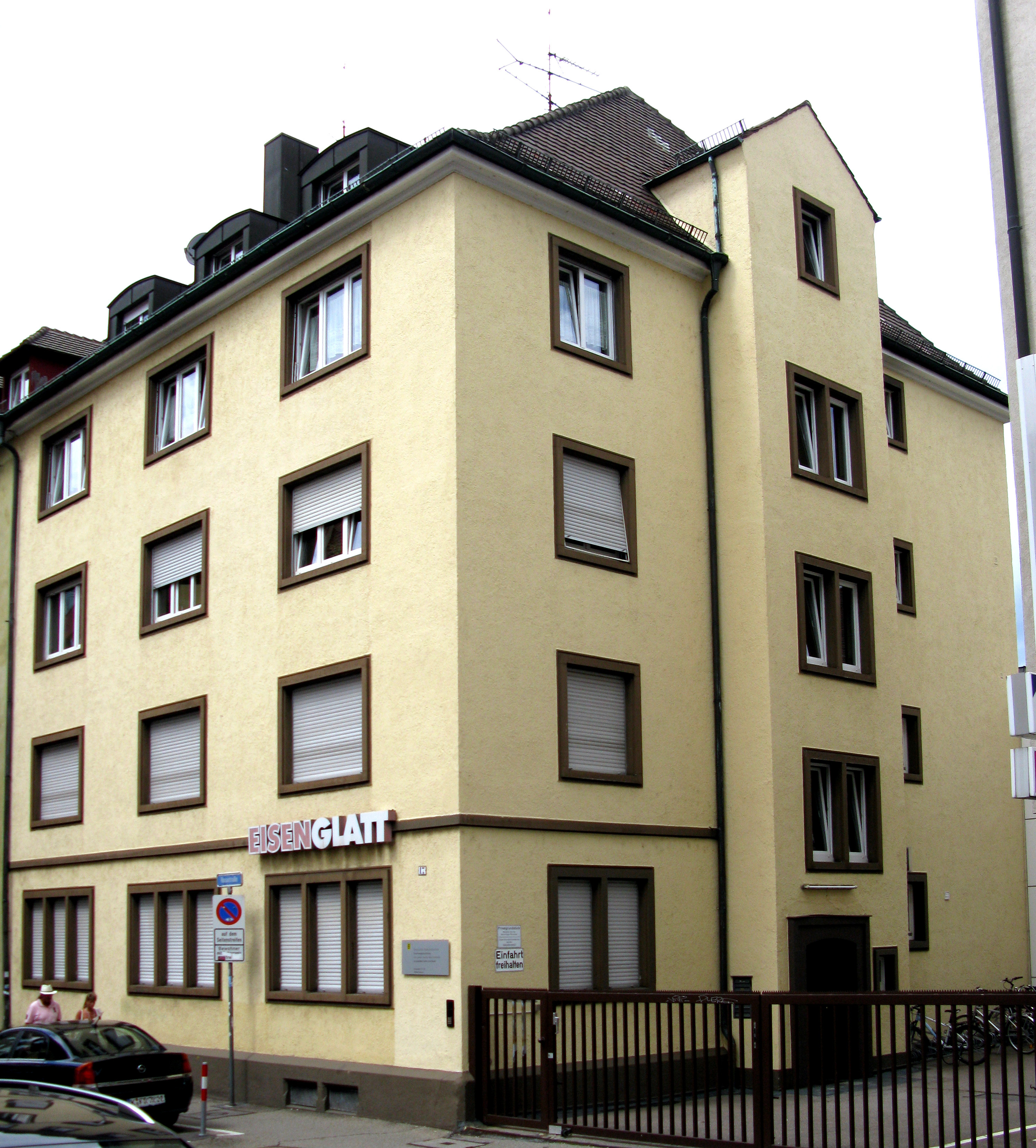
- Building of Deutsches Volksliedarchiv
- Established: 1914; 112 years ago
- Field of research: Popular music in past and presence
- Location: Rosastraße 17, Freiburg im Breisgau, Baden-Württemberg, Germany
- Operating agency: University of Freiburg
- Website: uni-freiburg.de/zpkm/

The Deutsche Volksliedarchiv, a research institute for Volkslied (folk song) in German, was founded in 1914 and was integrated into the University of Freiburg in 2014, now called Zentrum für Populäre Kultur und Musik (Centre of popular culture and music). It has extensive collections of traditional and popular songs, maintained and expanded in the new centre, and accessible to the public without restriction. Before 2014, it was an independent scientific research institute of the state Baden-Württemberg, based in Freiburg im Breisgau.

== History ==
The institution was founded in 1914 by the Germanist and folklorist John Meier, aiming to collect and document Volkslieder (folk songs) and to publish them in a complete scholarly edition. The publishing was successful for ballades between 1935 and 1996.

Meier's enterprise was scientifically advanced at the time, especially the recourse to the then still novel empirical methods (active collection activity). It was based on national and folk-pedagogical efforts, to pass cultural heritage to people uprooted by modernity. Meier rejected the contemporary Unterhaltungsmusik (entertainment music) (operetta, Schlager), but also collected "Kunstlied im Volksmund" (art song in people's mouth). During the period of National Socialism and World War II, the Archive continued its activities of collecting, documentation and editing. Ideologically, the national and folk-pedagogical accents already established in 1914 were reinforced, but Meyer avoided racist and antisemitic tones. During the war, there were efforts to integrate the archive into the University of Freiburg, but this step was not taken at the time.

After its founders death, the institute was taken over in 1953 by the state of Baden-Württemberg as a research institution, with a library dedicated to the collections. The legal basis was a donation contract: Meier had left his scientific library and collections to the state, while the institute's building – Meier's former residence – was purchased by the state and left to the archive until 2011.

During the 1960s, the scientific spectrum was expanded, in terms of both focus and research. In particular, the political songs and the singer-songwriter scene (Liedermacher) were included. A renewed and comprehensive modernization was undertaken in the 2000s, especially by including contemporary musical culture and by paying attention to media issues. At the same time, the Archive released new publications: the two online encyclopaedias Historisch-kritisches Liederlexikon from 2005, and Songlexikon from 2011. At the same time, the series Populäre Kultur und Musik (Popular Culture and Music), edited by Michael Fischer and Nils Grosch, was founded to complement and extend the older series Volksliedstudien (Folk Song Studies).

In 2010, the Deutsches Musicalarchiv (German Musical Archive) was founded, focused on the musical genre, as a legally dependent unit of the Archive, to provide a research basis, and supported by a circle of friends and sponsors. An additional Internationales Popmusikarchiv (International Pop Music Archive) is planned. In 2011, the Deutsche Forschungsgemeinschaft awarded the institute the title of a "herausragende Forschungsbibliothek" (outstanding research library), and provided financial support for the establishment of the pop music archive.

In 2012, the research institute moved into new premises with an area of 1,000 square metres (previously only 400 square metres were available in the former Meiers residential building) and new equipment in Rosastraße in Freiburg. Recently, these rooms have been supplemented by a separate external storage building.

Until 2014, the Archive was formally an "authority of the country subordinate to the Ministry of Science, Research and Art". In March 2014, the Ministry of Science decided to integrate the Archive into the University of Freiburg, named Zentrum für Populäre Kultur und Musik, as a research centre for popular culture and music in the past and presence.

== Collections, documentation and library ==
The archive has extensive historical and current collections on popular song and popular music, in particular about 250,000 song documents, the core of which was collected in a collection campaign carried out in all German-speaking countries from 1912 to 1930. 3,000 documents alone date from the First World War period. The centre also houses a number of special collections, for example on Soldatenlied, on industrial folk music and on individual song media (song pamphlets, handwritten and printed songbooks. Meanwhile, there is an extensive sound carrier collection, about 20,000 singles with popular music as well as a unique music library of the 19th century with about 10,000 units. The collections were listed Cultural heritage in 2013.

== Literature ==
- Otto Holzapfel. Das Deutsche Volksliedarchiv Freiburg i. Br. Lang, Bern 1989.
- Michael Fischer: Flugschrift und Volkslied. Zur Sammlungs- und Bestandsgeschichte im Deutschen Volksliedarchiv. In Albrecht Classen, Michael Fischer, Nils Grosch (ed.): Kultur- und kommunikationshistorischer Wandel des Liedes im 16. Jahrhundert. Münster 2012, pp. 57–71.
- Michael Fischer: Rekonstruktion und Dekonstruktion. Die Edition "Deutsche Volkslieder mit ihren Melodien" (1935–1996) und die Online-Publikation "Populäre und traditionelle Lieder. Historisch-kritisches Liederlexikon" (2005.|ff.). in Lied und populäre Kultur / Song and Popular Culture. Jahrbuch des Deutschen Volksliedarchivs, 54 (2009), pp. 33–61.
- Michael Fischer: 100 Jahre Deutsches Volksliedarchiv – Gründung des Zentrums für Populäre Kultur und Musik. In Lied und Populäre Kultur / Song and Popular Culture. Jahrbuch des Zentrums für Populäre Kultur und Musik 59 (2014), pp. 9–18. Available online at Digitalisat
