= Johann Lewalter =

German teacher (1862–1935)

- Born: January 24, 1862; Kassel, Germany
- Died: September 30, 1935 (aged 73); Kassel, Germany
- Occupations: Teacher, Composer, Folklorist, Heimat Writer

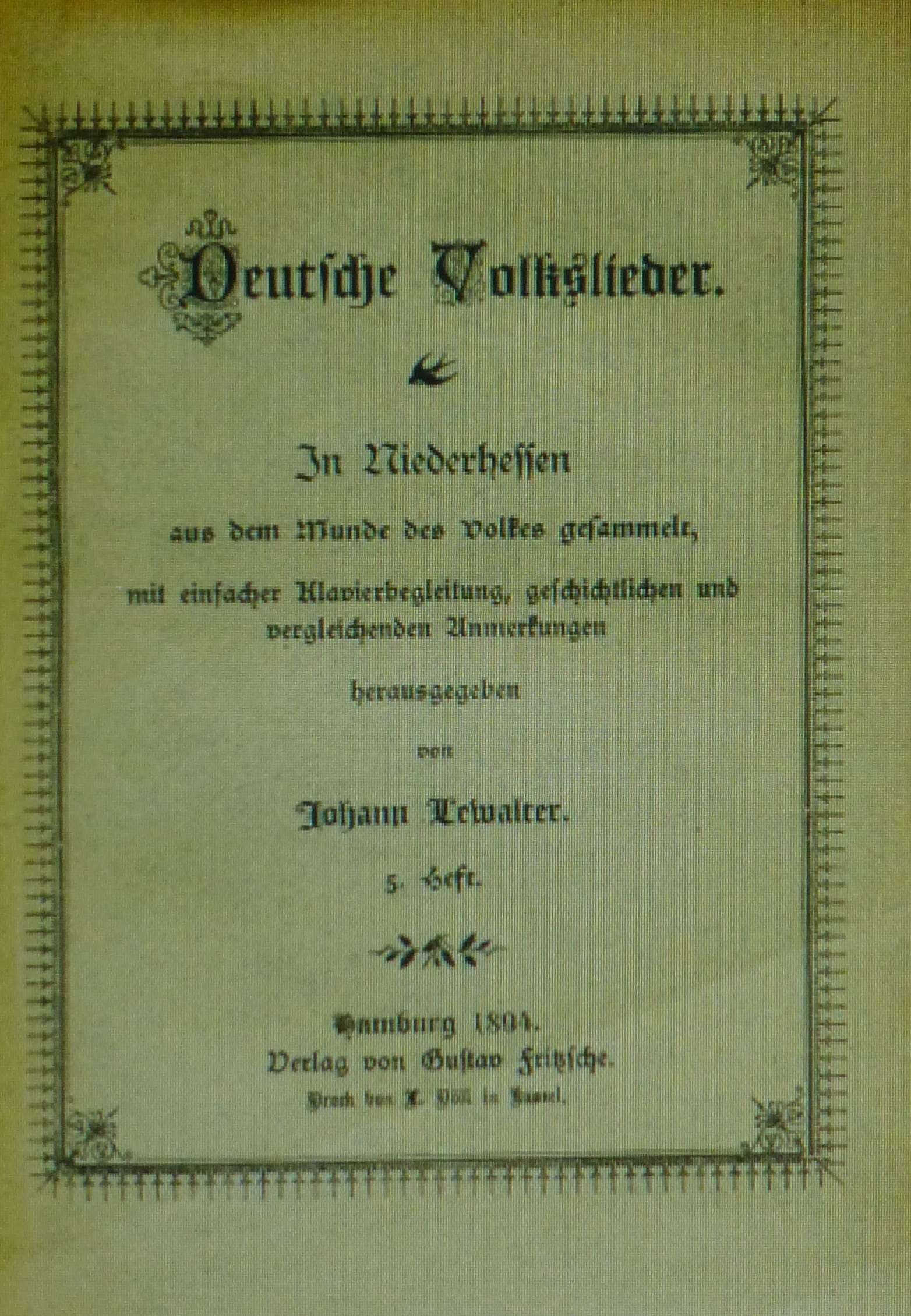
Deutsche Volkslieder in Niederhessen (1894) Gustav Fritsche Publishing House, Hamburg

Johann Lewalter (24 January 1862 – 30 September 1935) was a German teacher, composer, folklorist, and writer on local heritage. Born and based in Kassel, he devoted his career to education and the preservation of regional traditions in Hesse.

== Life ==
Johann Lewalter was the son of a printing house owner and initially learned the printing trade. Later, he studied music at the Leipzig Conservatory and became a music teacher in Kassel. He published approximately 230 folk and children's songs that he had collected in northern Hesse, especially in Rengershausen, Harleshausen, and Kirchditmold. In addition, Lewalter collected and notated the Schwälmer dances performed on festive occasions.

== Works ==
Lewalter’s published works focused on collecting and analyzing regional folk songs, dances, and poems. His notable publications include:

- Deutsche Volkslieder. In Niederhessen aus dem Munde des Volkes gesammelt, mit einfacher Klavierbegleitung, geschichtlichen und vergleichenden Anmerkungen. 5 issues. Hamburg 1890–94. Reprinted in one volume: Olms, Hildesheim 1982, ISBN 3-487-05369-1; Heft 3, 1892: Johann Lewalter is available for free viewing and download at the Internet Archive; Heft 4, 1893: Johann Lewalter is available for free viewing and download at the Internet Archive)
- Hessische Kinderliedchen. In Kassel im Verein mit Johann Lewalter gesammelt und erläutert von Gustav Eskuche. Kühn, Kassel 1891
- Schwälmer Tänze. Ries & Erler, Berlin 1903.
- O Mensch, dhu dinne Augen uff. A poem in Kassel dialect by Heinrich Jonas, set to music for solo voice with piano accompaniment by Johann Lewalter, Op. 56. Simon, Kassel ca. 1909.
- Deutsches Kinderlied und Kinderspiel. In Kassel aus Kindermund in Wort und Weise gesammelt. Mit einer wissenschaftlichen Abhandlung von Georg Schläger. Vietor, Kassel 1911.
- Reichswacht. Marschlieder für unsere Jugendwehr und das feldgraue Heer. 9 issues. Brunnemann, Kassel 1914 ff.
- Feldblumen. Gedichte. Vietor, Kassel 1917.
- Das alte Puppenspiel Dr. Fausts Leben und Höllenfahrt. Vietor, Kassel 1919.
- Dr. Kasper: Puppenspiel in 2 Aufzügen. Vietor, Kassel 1920.
- Herbstfäden. Gedichte. Vietor, Kassel [1922].
- With Wilhelm Ide: Frisch auf! Liederbuch für hessische Wandersleute. Bernecker, Meisungen 1930.
- With Wilhelm Ide: Fröhliches Wandern. Liederbuch für Hessen-Waldecks wandernde Jugend. Bernecker, Meisungen 1931.
- Ich weiss ein teuerwertes Land. Hessenlied by Karl Altmüller, arranged for a three‑voice school choir by Johann Lewalter. Partitura. Röttger, Kassel [date unknown].

== Legacy ==
The Lewalterbrunnen in Eschenstruth is named in his honor.
