= Rudolf-Oetker-Halle =

Concert hall of Bielefeld, North Rhine-Westphalia, Germany

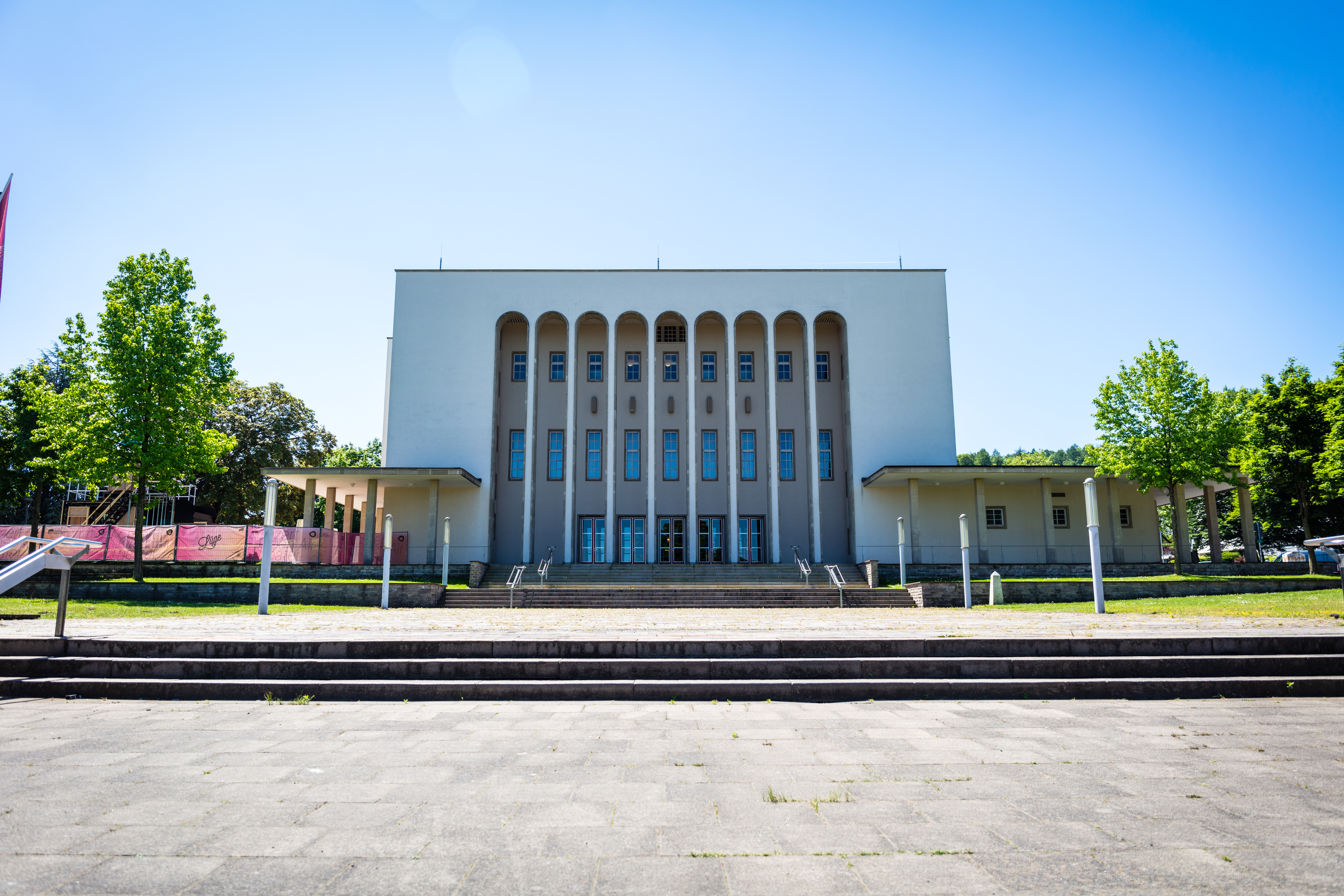
- Interactive map of Rudolf-Oetker-Halle
- Location: Bielefeld, North Rhine-Westphalia, Germany
- Coordinates: 52°01′42″N 08°30′48″E

Construction
- Opened: 1930
- Architects: Tietmann & Haake

Website
- rudolf-oetker-halle.de

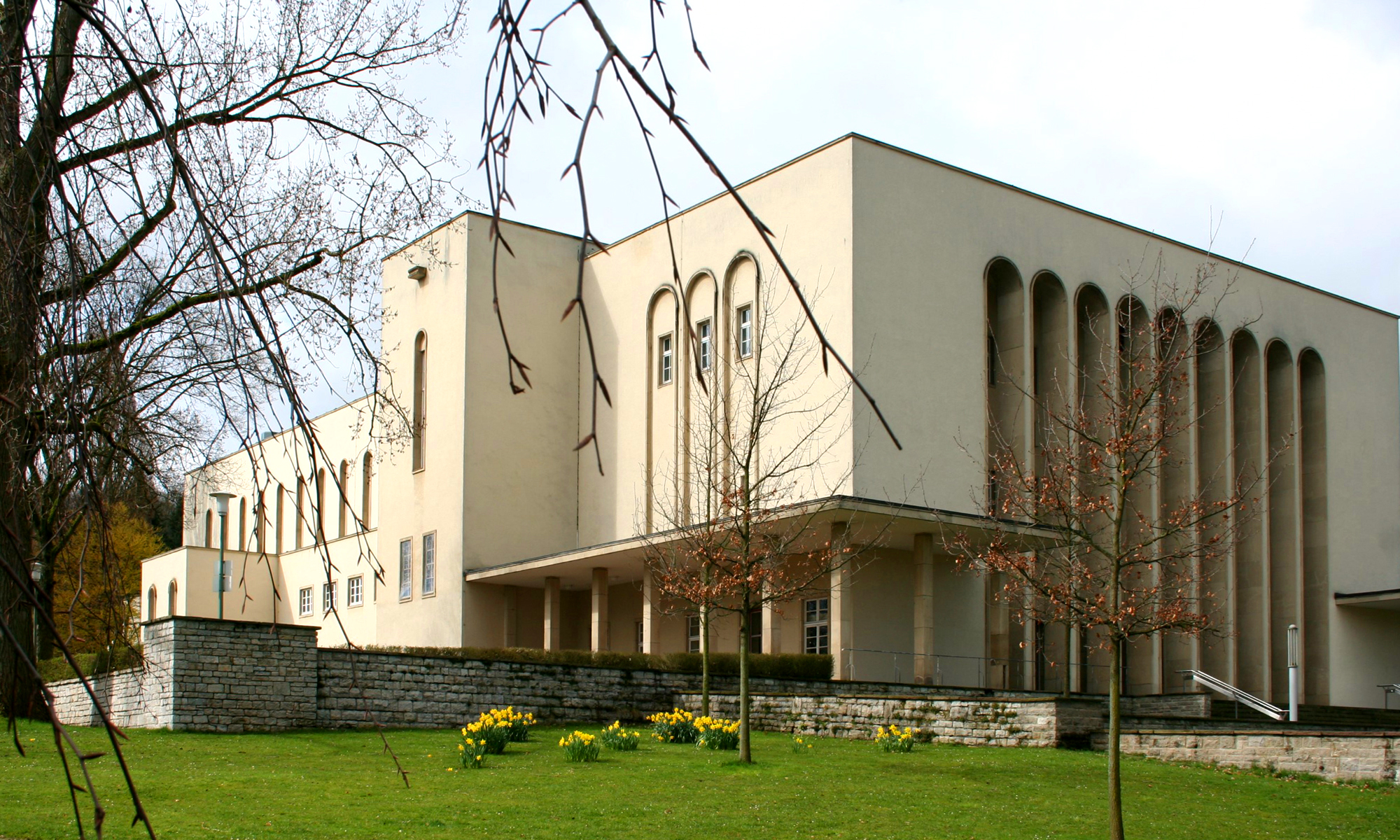
Rudolf-Oetker-Halle in 2008

The Rudolf-Oetker-Halle (ROH) is the concert hall of Bielefeld, North Rhine-Westphalia, Germany. It was built from 1928 to 1930 after designs by Düsseldorf architects Tietmann & Haake, opened on 31 October 1930. The listed monument is mostly in the original state and has excellent acoustics. The hall has been managed by the Theater Bielefeld from 2018. It is the home of the Bielefelder Philharmoniker.

== History ==
=== Planning and building ===
Richard Kaselowsky, an entrepreneur, and mayor Rudolf Stapenhorst had the first official conversation about a concert hall for Bielefeld on 14 February 1925. Shortly afterwards, the Oetker company confirmed it was ready to build a concert hall, to be named after Rudolf Oetker. Stapenhorst proposed a municipal property west of the Bürgerpark. It was inspected on 15 April 1926 by all interested, from Oetker, the municipal government, the Musikverein and the municipal orchestra, who accepted the concept. The hall was designated for music and other cultural events such as lectures and conventions, but political events were not permitted. A competition requested entries from architects from northwestern Germany. A large concert hall for 1,400 listeners, with a podium for 300 singers and 100 musicians, was to be built and a chamber music hall for 400 listeners. Design requests included a simple and decent form, and good acoustics in both halls. The competition resulted in 113 entries.

The jury included German Bestelmeyer, professor of architecture in Munich, and Heinrich Tessenow, professor in Berlin, Eugen Michel, professor of acoustics at the Technische Hochschule Hannover, who served later as advisor throughout the building phase. Oetker was represented by Lina Oetker, the wife of the founder, and Ida Kaselowsky, the widow of Rudolf Oetker who fell in World War I. Oberbaurat Friedrich Schultz, leading the municipal building administration, was on the jury, as well as architect Bernhard Kramer representing the mayor, and Wilhelm Lamping. The jury decided for the proposal of the Düsseldorf architects Tietmann & Haake. The technical supervision rested with the municipal Stadtbauamt. The Bauantrag was ready in June 1928. The hall was opened on 31 October 1930.

=== 21st century ===
The listed monument is mostly in the original state and has excellent acoustics. In 2004, it was changed temporarily to serve as the stage of the Theater Bielefeld for two years while the theatre building was renovated. These changes were reverted afterwards.

The Rudolf-Oetker-Halle is the concert hall of Bielefeld and its region, playing music of many genres, performed by both international soloists and local groups. The hall has been managed by the Theater Bielefeld from 2018. It is the home of the Bielefelder Philharmoniker. Its architecture and acoustics make it a centre of cultural life in Bielefeld.
