= List of German football transfers winter 2022–23 =

This is a list of German football transfers in the winter transfer window 2022–23 by club. Only transfers of the Bundesliga, and 2. Bundesliga are included.

== Bundesliga ==
Note: Flags indicate national team as has been defined under FIFA eligibility rules. Players may hold more than one non-FIFA nationality.

=== FC Bayern Munich ===
In:

| No. | Pos. | Nation | Player |
|---|---|---|---|
| 22 | DF | POR | João Cancelo (on loan from Manchester City) |
| 23 | DF | NED | Daley Blind (from Ajax) |
| 27 | GK | SUI | Yann Sommer (from Borussia Mönchengladbach) |

Out:

| No. | Pos. | Nation | Player |
|---|---|---|---|
| 18 | MF | AUT | Marcel Sabitzer (on loan to Manchester United) |

=== Borussia Dortmund ===
In:

| No. | Pos. | Nation | Player |
|---|---|---|---|
| 16 | FW | BEL | Julien Duranville (from Anderlecht) |
| 26 | DF | NOR | Julian Ryerson (from Union Berlin) |

Out:

| No. | Pos. | Nation | Player |
|---|---|---|---|
| 10 | MF | BEL | Thorgan Hazard (on loan to PSV) |

=== Bayer Leverkusen ===
In:

| No. | Pos. | Nation | Player |
|---|---|---|---|
| 18 | MF | BEL | Noah Mbamba (from Club Brugge) |
| 28 | GK | AUT | Patrick Pentz (from Stade Reims) |
| — | MF | COL | Gustavo Puerta (from Bogotá) |

Out:

| No. | Pos. | Nation | Player |
|---|---|---|---|
| 7 | FW | BRA | Paulinho (on loan to Atlético Mineiro) |
| 20 | MF | CHI | Charles Aránguiz (to Internacional) |
| 29 | MF | DEN | Zidan Sertdemir (to Nordsjælland) |
| — | MF | COL | Gustavo Puerta (on loan to 1. FC Nürnberg) |

=== RB Leipzig ===
In:

| No. | Pos. | Nation | Player |

Out:

| No. | Pos. | Nation | Player |
|---|---|---|---|
| 38 | MF | ESP | Hugo Novoa (on loan to Basel) |
| — | MF | GER | Ben Klefisch (to SC Paderborn II, previously on loan at Viktoria Köln) |

=== Union Berlin ===
In:

| No. | Pos. | Nation | Player |
|---|---|---|---|
| 18 | DF | CRO | Josip Juranović (from Celtic) |
| 20 | MF | TUN | Aïssa Laïdouni (from Ferencváros) |
| 26 | DF | FRA | Jérôme Roussillon (from VfL Wolfsburg) |

Out:

| No. | Pos. | Nation | Player |
|---|---|---|---|
| 6 | DF | NOR | Julian Ryerson (to Borussia Dortmund) |
| 21 | FW | GER | Tim Skarke (on loan to Schalke 04) |
| 24 | MF | JPN | Genki Haraguchi (to VfB Stuttgart) |
| 26 | DF | POL | Tymoteusz Puchacz (on loan to Panathinaikos) |
| 35 | MF | GER | Fabio Schneider (to Greifswalder FC) |
| — | DF | GER | Mathis Bruns (on loan to Lecce youth) |
| — | MF | GER | Laurenz Dehl (on loan to Viktoria Berlin, previously on loan at Bohemians) |

=== SC Freiburg ===
In:

| No. | Pos. | Nation | Player |

Out:

| No. | Pos. | Nation | Player |
|---|---|---|---|
| 2 | DF | BEL | Hugo Siquet (on loan to Cercle Brugge) |
| 20 | FW | GER | Kevin Schade (on loan to Brentford) |
| 31 | DF | GER | Keven Schlotterbeck (on loan to VfL Bochum) |

=== 1. FC Köln ===
In:

| No. | Pos. | Nation | Player |
|---|---|---|---|
| 27 | FW | GER | Davie Selke (from Hertha BSC) |
| — | GK | GER | Julian Roloff (from Cavalry FC) |

Out:

| No. | Pos. | Nation | Player |
|---|---|---|---|
| 18 | MF | SVK | Ondrej Duda (on loan to Hellas Verona) |
| 40 | GK | GER | Jonas Urbig (on loan to Jahn Regensburg) |
| — | DF | GER | Noah Katterbach (on loan to Hamburger SV, previously on loan at Basel) |

=== Mainz 05 ===
In:

| No. | Pos. | Nation | Player |
|---|---|---|---|
| 17 | FW | FRA | Ludovic Ajorque (from Strasbourg) |
| 25 | DF | NOR | Andreas Hanche-Olsen (from Gent) |

Out:

| No. | Pos. | Nation | Player |
|---|---|---|---|
| 10 | MF | FRA | Angelo Fulgini (on loan to Lens) |
| 17 | MF | GER | Niklas Tauer (on loan to Schalke 04) |
| 38 | FW | GER | Ben Bobzien (on loan to SV Elversberg) |
| — | DF | FRA | Ronaël Pierre-Gabriel (on loan to Espanyol, previously on loan at Strasbourg) |

=== 1899 Hoffenheim ===
In:

| No. | Pos. | Nation | Player |
|---|---|---|---|
| 17 | MF | DEN | Thomas Delaney (on loan from Sevilla) |
| 19 | FW | DEN | Kasper Dolberg (on loan from Nice, previously on loan at Sevilla) |
| 23 | DF | USA | John Brooks (from Benfica) |

Out:

| No. | Pos. | Nation | Player |
|---|---|---|---|
| 21 | DF | GER | Benjamin Hübner (retired) |
| 33 | FW | FRA | Georginio Rutter (to Leeds United) |

=== Borussia Mönchengladbach ===
In:

| No. | Pos. | Nation | Player |
|---|---|---|---|
| 1 | GK | SUI | Jonas Omlin (from Montpellier) |

Out:

| No. | Pos. | Nation | Player |
|---|---|---|---|
| 1 | GK | SUI | Yann Sommer (to Bayern Munich) |
| 26 | MF | GER | Torben Müsel (to Rot-Weiss Essen) |
| 27 | MF | GER | Rocco Reitz (on loan to Sint-Truiden) |

=== Eintracht Frankfurt ===
In:

| No. | Pos. | Nation | Player |
|---|---|---|---|
| 30 | MF | USA | Paxten Aaronson (from Philadelphia Union) |
| 32 | DF | GER | Philipp Max (on loan from PSV) |
| 41 | GK | ALB | Simon Simoni (from Dinamo Tirana) |

Out:

| No. | Pos. | Nation | Player |
|---|---|---|---|
| 4 | DF | CMR | Jérôme Onguéné (on loan to Red Bull Salzburg) |
| 33 | DF | ITA | Luca Pellegrini (loan return to Juventus) |

=== VfL Wolfsburg ===
In:

| No. | Pos. | Nation | Player |
|---|---|---|---|
| 8 | DF | FRA | Nicolas Cozza (from Montpellier) |

Out:

| No. | Pos. | Nation | Player |
|---|---|---|---|
| 14 | MF | CRO | Josip Brekalo (to Fiorentina) |
| 15 | DF | FRA | Jérôme Roussillon (to Union Berlin) |
| 17 | FW | GER | Maximilian Philipp (on loan to Werder Bremen) |

=== VfL Bochum ===
In:

| No. | Pos. | Nation | Player |
|---|---|---|---|
| 28 | MF | CMR | Pierre Kunde (on loan from Olympiacos) |
| 29 | FW | GER | Moritz Broschinski (from Borussia Dortmund II) |
| 31 | DF | GER | Keven Schlotterbeck (on loan from SC Freiburg) |

Out:

| No. | Pos. | Nation | Player |
|---|---|---|---|
| 14 | DF | GER | Tim Oermann (on loan to Wolfsberger AC) |
| 32 | FW | GER | Tarsis Bonga (to Eintracht Braunschweig) |
| 38 | DF | GER | Jannes Horn (on loan to 1. FC Nürnberg) |
| 39 | FW | FRA | Lys Mousset (on loan to Nîmes) |

=== FC Augsburg ===
In:

| No. | Pos. | Nation | Player |
|---|---|---|---|
| 7 | FW | CRO | Dion Drena Beljo (from Osijek) |
| 8 | MF | POR | Renato Veiga (on loan from Sporting CP) |
| 27 | MF | BEL | Arne Engels (from Club NXT) |
| 34 | FW | FRA | Nathanaël Mbuku (from Stade Reims) |
| 38 | DF | CRO | David Čolina (from Hajduk Split) |
| 45 | FW | ITA | Kelvin Yeboah (on loan from Genoa) |
| 48 | FW | FRA | Irvin Cardona (from Brest) |

Out:

| No. | Pos. | Nation | Player |
|---|---|---|---|
| 7 | FW | GER | Florian Niederlechner (to Hertha BSC) |
| 8 | MF | ECU | Carlos Gruezo (to San Jose Earthquakes) |
| 21 | FW | GER | Lukas Petkov (on loan to Greuther Fürth) |
| 26 | DF | DEN | Frederik Winther (on loan to Brøndby) |
| 32 | DF | GER | Raphael Framberger (on loan to SV Sandhausen) |
| — | FW | VEN | Sergio Córdova (to Vancouver Whitecaps, previously on loan at Real Salt Lake) |

=== VfB Stuttgart ===
In:

| No. | Pos. | Nation | Player |
|---|---|---|---|
| 17 | MF | JPN | Genki Haraguchi (from Union Berlin) |
| 31 | FW | POR | Gil Dias (from Benfica) |

Out:

| No. | Pos. | Nation | Player |
|---|---|---|---|
| 32 | MF | FRA | Naouirou Ahamada (to Crystal Palace) |
| — | MF | GER | Mateo Klimowicz (on loan to San Luis, previously on loan at Arminia Bielefeld) |
| — | FW | FRA | Alexis Tibidi (to Troyes, previously on loan at SCR Altach) |

=== Hertha BSC ===
In:

| No. | Pos. | Nation | Player |
|---|---|---|---|
| 6 | MF | TUR | Tolga Ciğerci (from MKE Ankaragücü) |
| 7 | FW | GER | Florian Niederlechner (from FC Augsburg) |

Out:

| No. | Pos. | Nation | Player |
|---|---|---|---|
| 6 | MF | CZE | Vladimir Darida (to Aris) |
| 7 | FW | GER | Davie Selke (to 1. FC Köln) |
| 11 | FW | FRA | Myziane Maolida (on loan to Stade Reims) |
| 30 | FW | KOR | Lee Dong-jun (to Jeonbuk Hyundai Motors) |
| 36 | DF | NED | Deyovaisio Zeefuik (on loan to Hellas Verona) |
| 44 | DF | GER | Linus Gechter (on loan to Eintracht Braunschweig) |
| — | MF | ARG | Santiago Ascacíbar (on loan to Estudiantes, previously on loan at Cremonese) |
| — | DF | NOR | Fredrik André Bjørkan (to Bodø/Glimt, previously on loan at Feyenoord) |
| — | FW | NED | Daishawn Redan (to Venezia, previously on loan at Utrecht) |

=== Schalke 04 ===
In:

| No. | Pos. | Nation | Player |
|---|---|---|---|
| 18 | DF | FIN | Jere Uronen (on loan from Brest) |
| 20 | FW | GER | Tim Skarke (on loan from Union Berlin) |
| 21 | MF | GER | Niklas Tauer (on loan from Mainz 05) |
| 25 | DF | GER | Moritz Jenz (on loan from Lorient, previously on loan at Celtic) |
| 26 | FW | SUI | Michael Frey (on loan from Royal Antwerp) |
| 33 | MF | COL | Éder Balanta (on loan from Club Brugge) |

Out:

| No. | Pos. | Nation | Player |
|---|---|---|---|
| 7 | FW | SWE | Jordan Larsson (on loan to Copenhagen) |
| 17 | MF | GER | Florian Flick (on loan to 1. FC Nürnberg) |
| 20 | MF | FRA | Florent Mollet (to Nantes) |
| 42 | MF | GER | Kerim Çalhanoğlu (on loan to SV Sandhausen) |

=== Werder Bremen ===
In:

| No. | Pos. | Nation | Player |
|---|---|---|---|
| 17 | FW | GER | Maximilian Philipp (on loan from VfL Wolfsburg) |

Out:

| No. | Pos. | Nation | Player |
|---|---|---|---|
| 9 | FW | SCO | Oliver Burke (on loan to Millwall) |
| 23 | MF | GER | Nicolai Rapp (on loan to 1. FC Kaiserslautern) |
| 24 | FW | GER | Benjamin Goller (to 1. FC Nürnberg) |

== 2. Bundesliga ==
=== Arminia Bielefeld ===
In:

| No. | Pos. | Nation | Player |
|---|---|---|---|
| 18 | FW | GER | Christopher Schepp (from Blau-Weiß Lohne) |
| 20 | FW | CAN | Theo Corbeanu (on loan from Wolverhampton Wanderers, previously on loan at Blackpool) |
| 31 | GK | AUT | Armin Gremsl (from SCR Altach) |

Out:

| No. | Pos. | Nation | Player |
|---|---|---|---|
| 1 | GK | GRE | Stefanos Kapino (to Miedź Legnica) |
| 8 | MF | GER | Mateo Klimowicz (loan return to VfB Stuttgart) |
| — | MF | GER | Vladislav Cherny (on loan to Wiedenbrück, previously on loan at Schaffhausen) |

=== Greuther Fürth ===
In:

| No. | Pos. | Nation | Player |
|---|---|---|---|
| 16 | FW | GER | Lukas Petkov (on loan from FC Augsburg) |

Out:

| No. | Pos. | Nation | Player |
|---|---|---|---|
| 21 | MF | GER | Timothy Tillman (to Los Angeles) |
| 28 | MF | GER | Jeremy Dudziak (on loan to Hatayspor) |

=== Hamburger SV ===
In:

| No. | Pos. | Nation | Player |
|---|---|---|---|
| 16 | DF | ESP | Javi Montero (on loan from Beşiktaş) |
| 20 | FW | HUN | András Németh (from Genk) |
| 33 | DF | GER | Noah Katterbach (on loan from 1. FC Köln, previously on loan at Basel) |

Out:

| No. | Pos. | Nation | Player |
|---|---|---|---|
| 21 | DF | GER | Tim Leibold (to Sporting Kansas City) |

=== Darmstadt 98 ===
In:

| No. | Pos. | Nation | Player |
|---|---|---|---|
| 40 | FW | SUI | Filip Stojilković (from Sion) |

Out:

| No. | Pos. | Nation | Player |
|---|---|---|---|
| 36 | FW | GER | André Leipold (on loan to Würzburger Kickers) |

=== FC St. Pauli ===
In:

| No. | Pos. | Nation | Player |
|---|---|---|---|
| 3 | DF | EST | Karol Mets (on loan from Zürich) |
| 9 | FW | BRA | Maurides (from Radomiak Radom) |
| 17 | FW | ENG | Dapo Afolayan (from Bolton Wanderers) |
| 26 | FW | GER | Elias Saad (from Eintracht Norderstedt) |

Out:

| No. | Pos. | Nation | Player |

=== 1. FC Heidenheim ===
In:

| No. | Pos. | Nation | Player |

Out:

| No. | Pos. | Nation | Player |

=== SC Paderborn ===
In:

| No. | Pos. | Nation | Player |
|---|---|---|---|
| 3 | DF | ENG | Bashir Humphreys (on loan from Chelsea) |
| 40 | MF | GER | Niclas Nadj (from Weiche Flensburg) |

Out:

| No. | Pos. | Nation | Player |
|---|---|---|---|
| 5 | MF | GER | Marcel Mehlem (on loan to SV Sandhausen) |
| 14 | MF | GHA | Kelvin Ofori (to Spartak Trnava) |
| 20 | DF | POL | Adrian Gryszkiewicz (to Raków Częstochowa) |

=== 1. FC Nürnberg ===
In:

| No. | Pos. | Nation | Player |
|---|---|---|---|
| 9 | FW | GER | Danny Blum (from APOEL) |
| 14 | FW | GER | Benjamin Goller (from Werder Bremen) |
| 21 | MF | GER | Florian Flick (on loan from Schalke 04) |
| 24 | MF | COL | Gustavo Puerta (on loan from Bayer Leverkusen) |
| 30 | GK | DEN | Peter Vindahl Jensen (on loan from AZ) |
| 38 | DF | GER | Jannes Horn (on loan from VfL Bochum) |

Out:

| No. | Pos. | Nation | Player |
|---|---|---|---|
| 18 | FW | GER | Manuel Wintzheimer (on loan to Eintracht Braunschweig) |

=== Holstein Kiel ===
In:

| No. | Pos. | Nation | Player |
|---|---|---|---|
| 35 | GK | GER | Robin Himmelmann (free agent) |

Out:

| No. | Pos. | Nation | Player |
|---|---|---|---|
| 15 | DF | GER | Johannes van den Bergh (free agent) |
| 38 | DF | USA | Nico Carrera (on loan to FSV Zwickau) |

=== Fortuna Düsseldorf ===
In:

| No. | Pos. | Nation | Player |

Out:

| No. | Pos. | Nation | Player |

=== Hannover 96 ===
In:

| No. | Pos. | Nation | Player |

Out:

| No. | Pos. | Nation | Player |

=== Karlsruher SC ===
In:

| No. | Pos. | Nation | Player |
|---|---|---|---|
| 18 | DF | GER | Daniel Brosinski (free agent) |
| 19 | FW | GEO | Budu Zivzivadze (from Fehérvár) |

Out:

| No. | Pos. | Nation | Player |
|---|---|---|---|
| 18 | DF | GER | Kilian Jakob (to Erzgebirge Aue) |
| 36 | FW | AUT | Kelvin Arase (on loan to KV Oostende) |
| 37 | DF | GER | Luca Bolay (to Waldhof Mannheim) |

=== Hansa Rostock ===
In:

| No. | Pos. | Nation | Player |

Out:

| No. | Pos. | Nation | Player |
|---|---|---|---|
| 33 | FW | GER | Theo Martens (on loan to Greifswalder FC) |

=== SV Sandhausen ===
In:

| No. | Pos. | Nation | Player |
|---|---|---|---|
| 5 | MF | GER | Marcel Mehlem (on loan from SC Paderborn) |
| 14 | FW | MAR | Hamadi Al Ghaddioui (from Pafos FC) |
| 20 | MF | GER | Kerim Çalhanoğlu (on loan from Schalke 04) |
| 32 | DF | GER | Raphael Framberger (on loan from FC Augsburg) |
| 38 | FW | CMR | Franck Evina (from Hannover 96 II) |

Out:

| No. | Pos. | Nation | Player |
|---|---|---|---|
| 7 | MF | BEN | Cebio Soukou (to Bandırmaspor) |
| 28 | MF | GER | Tom Trybull (to Blackpool) |
| 31 | DF | GER | Vincent Schwab (on loan to Eintracht Trier) |

=== Jahn Regensburg ===
In:

| No. | Pos. | Nation | Player |
|---|---|---|---|
| 40 | GK | GER | Jonas Urbig (on loan from 1. FC Köln) |

Out:

| No. | Pos. | Nation | Player |

=== 1. FC Magdeburg ===
In:

| No. | Pos. | Nation | Player |
|---|---|---|---|
| 3 | FW | NED | Luc Castaignos (free agent) |
| 15 | DF | GER | Daniel Heber (from Rot-Weiss Essen) |
| 31 | DF | AUT | Maximilian Ullmann (on loan from Venezia) |

Out:

| No. | Pos. | Nation | Player |
|---|---|---|---|
| 15 | MF | TUR | Ömer Faruk Beyaz (loan return to VfB Stuttgart) |

=== Eintracht Braunschweig ===
In:

| No. | Pos. | Nation | Player |
|---|---|---|---|
| 9 | FW | GER | Manuel Wintzheimer (on loan from 1. FC Nürnberg) |
| 13 | FW | GER | Tarsis Bonga (from VfL Bochum) |
| 29 | DF | TUR | Hasan Kuruçay (from HamKam) |
| 44 | DF | GER | Linus Gechter (on loan from Hertha BSC) |

Out:

| No. | Pos. | Nation | Player |
|---|---|---|---|
| 2 | DF | GER | Michael Schultz (to Viktoria Köln) |

=== 1. FC Kaiserslautern ===
In:

| No. | Pos. | Nation | Player |
|---|---|---|---|
| 4 | MF | GER | Nicolai Rapp (on loan from Werder Bremen) |
| 28 | FW | FRA | Nicolas de Préville (free agent) |

Out:

| No. | Pos. | Nation | Player |
|---|---|---|---|
| 6 | MF | TUR | Hikmet Çiftçi (on loan to Göztepe) |
| 15 | DF | GER | Maximilian Hippe (to SV Rödinghausen) |
| 17 | MF | GER | René Klingenburg (free agent) |
| 28 | MF | GER | Mike Wunderlich (to Viktoria Köln) |
| 36 | MF | GER | Anas Bakhat (to 1. FC Düren) |

== See also ==
- 2022–23 Bundesliga
- 2022–23 2. Bundesliga
