= Bielefeld =

- City
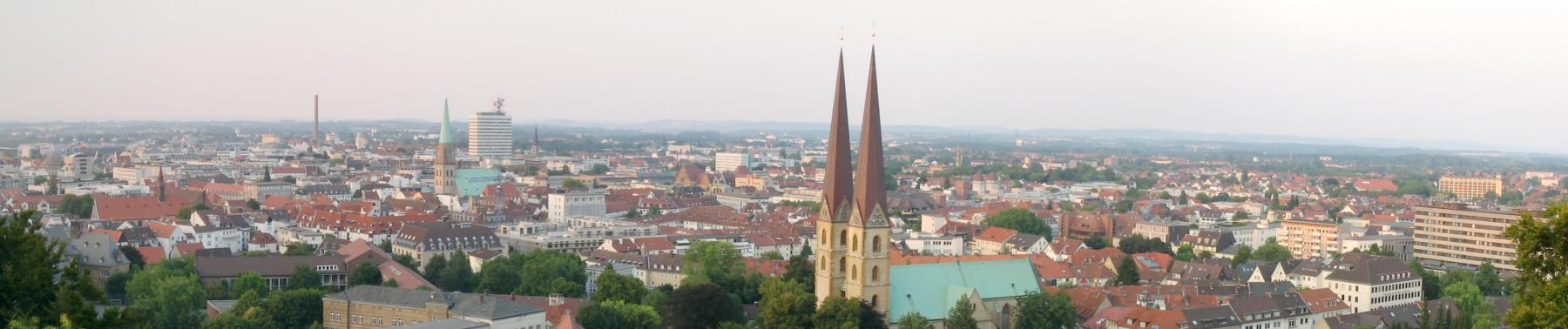
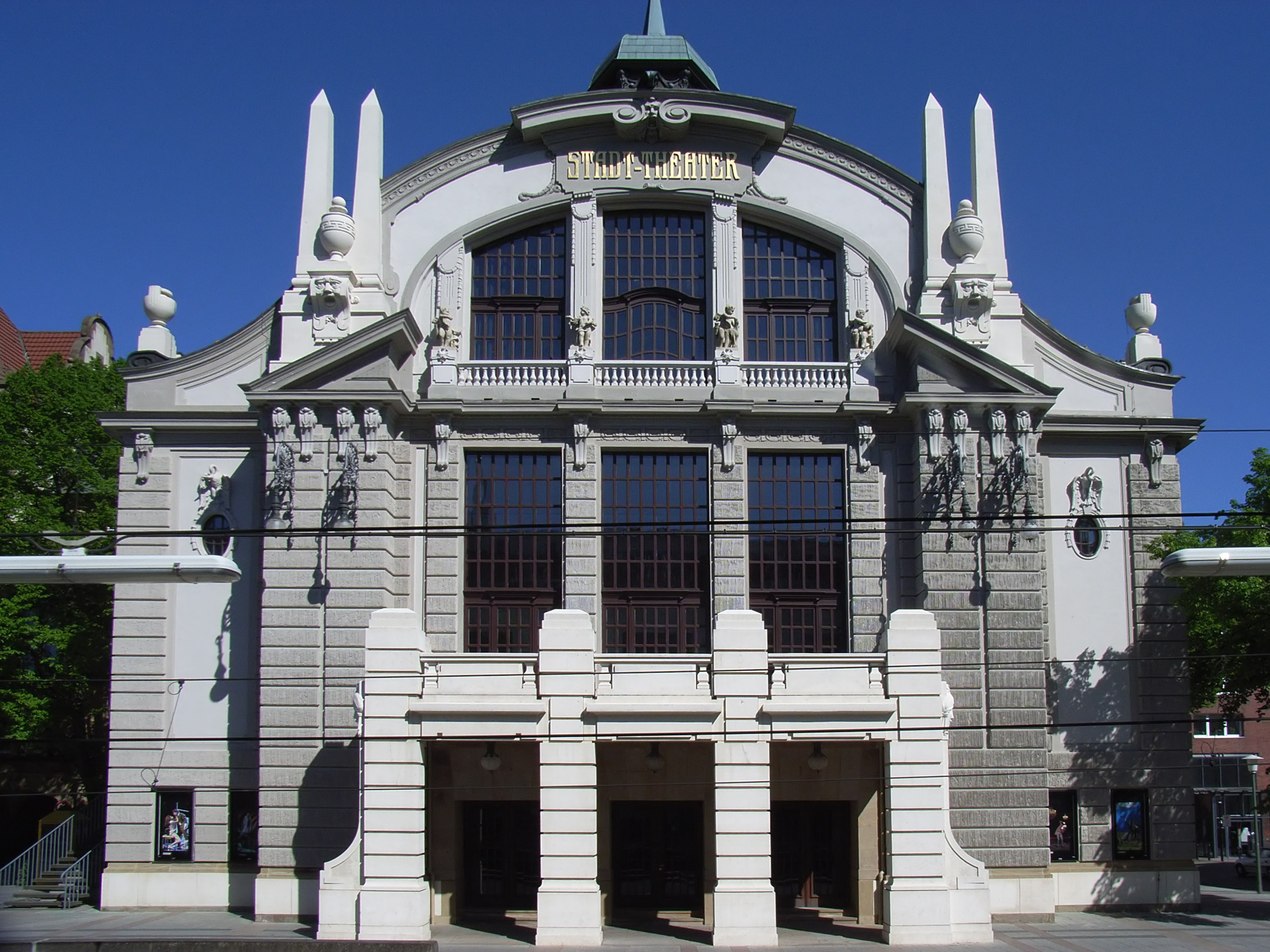
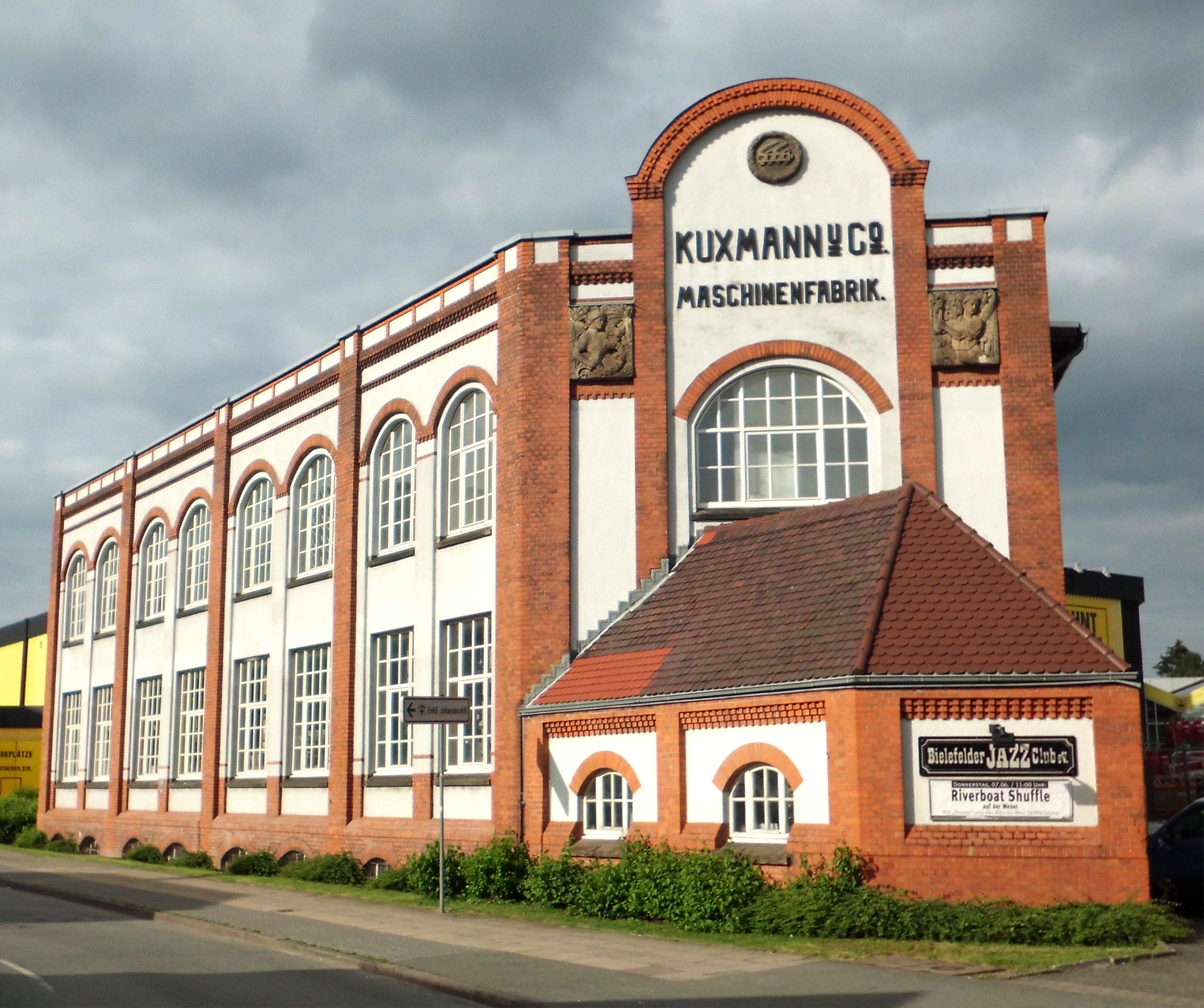
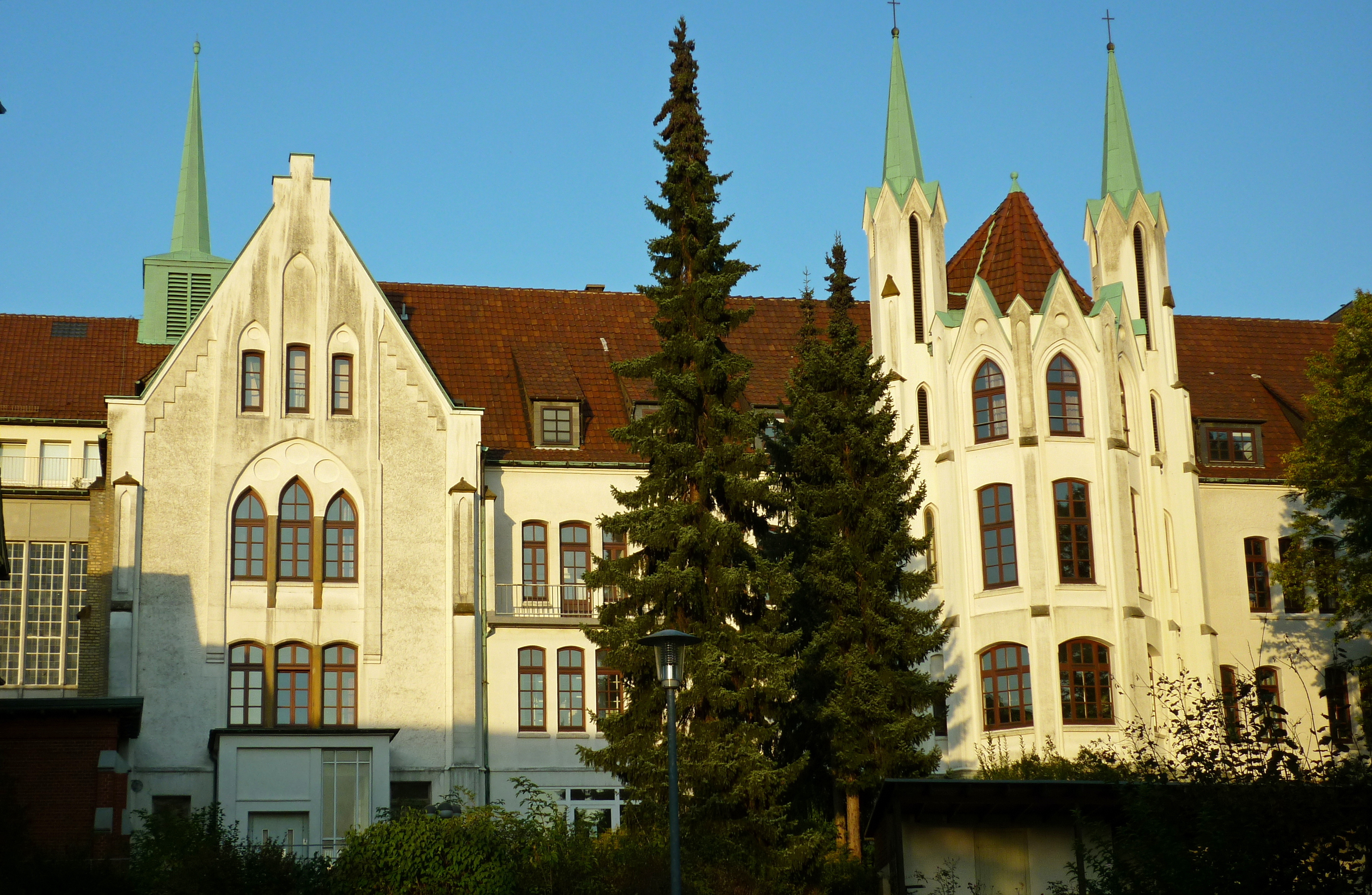
- Bielefeld as seen from Sparrenburg Castle Bielefeld Opera Gründerzeit architecture Bethel Foundation

- Flag Coat of arms

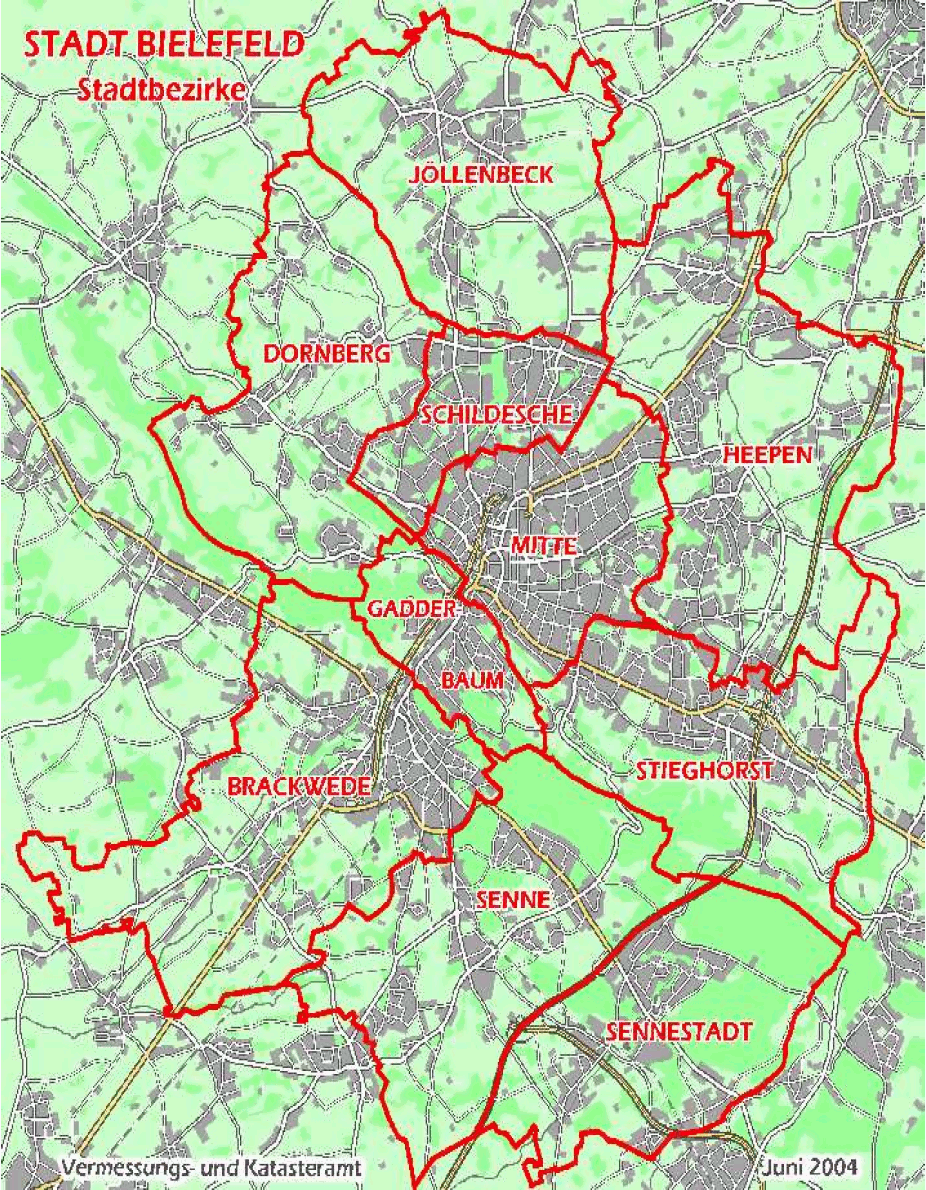
- Districts of Bielefeld: Bielefeld-Mitte (downtown), Brackwede, Dornberg, Gadderbaum, Heepen, Jöllenbeck, Schildesche, Senne, Sennestadt and Stieghorst
- Interactive map of Bielefeld
- Location within Germany Location within North Rhine-Westphalia
- Coordinates: 52°01′16″N 08°32′05″E
- Country: Germany
- State: North Rhine-Westphalia
- Admin. region: Detmold
- District: Urban district
- Founded: 1214
- Subdivisions: 10 districts

Government
  - Mayor (2025–30): Christiana Bauer (CDU)

Area
  - City: 258.83 km^{2} (99.93 sq mi)
- Elevation: 118 m (387 ft)

Population (2025-12-31)
  - City: 331,419
  - Density: 1,280.5/km^{2} (3,316.4/sq mi)
  - Urban: 591,862
- Time zone: UTC+01:00 (CET)
  - Summer (DST): UTC+02:00 (CEST)
- Postal codes: 33602–33739
- Dialling codes: 0521, 05202, 05203, 05205, 05206, 05208, 05209
- Vehicle registration: BI
- Website: www.bielefeld.de

Logo of the City of Bielefeld

Bielefeld (German: [ˈbiːləfɛlt]) is a city in the Ostwestfalen-Lippe region in the north-east of North Rhine-Westphalia, Germany. With a population of 342,952, it is also the most populous city in the administrative region (Regierungsbezirk) of Detmold and the 18th largest city in Germany.

The historical centre of the city is situated in the Ravensberg Basin north of the Teutoburg Forest hill range, but modern Bielefeld extends across the range and further south into the flat Westphalian Basin. The city is situated on the Hermannsweg, a hiking trail that runs for 156 km along the ridges of the Teutoburg Forest.

Bielefeld is home to a significant number of internationally operating companies, including Dr. Oetker, DMG Mori (former Gildemeister), Möller Group, Goldbeck and Schüco. It has a university and several technical colleges (Fachhochschulen). Bielefeld is also known for the Bethel Foundation.

== History ==
Historical Affiliations

Holy Roman Empire 1214–
Hanseatic League 14th century–
Berg (state) 1346–
Margraviate of Brandenburg 1614–
Minden-Ravensberg 1719–1807
Kingdom of Westphalia
Kingdom of Prussia (Province of Westphalia) 1815–

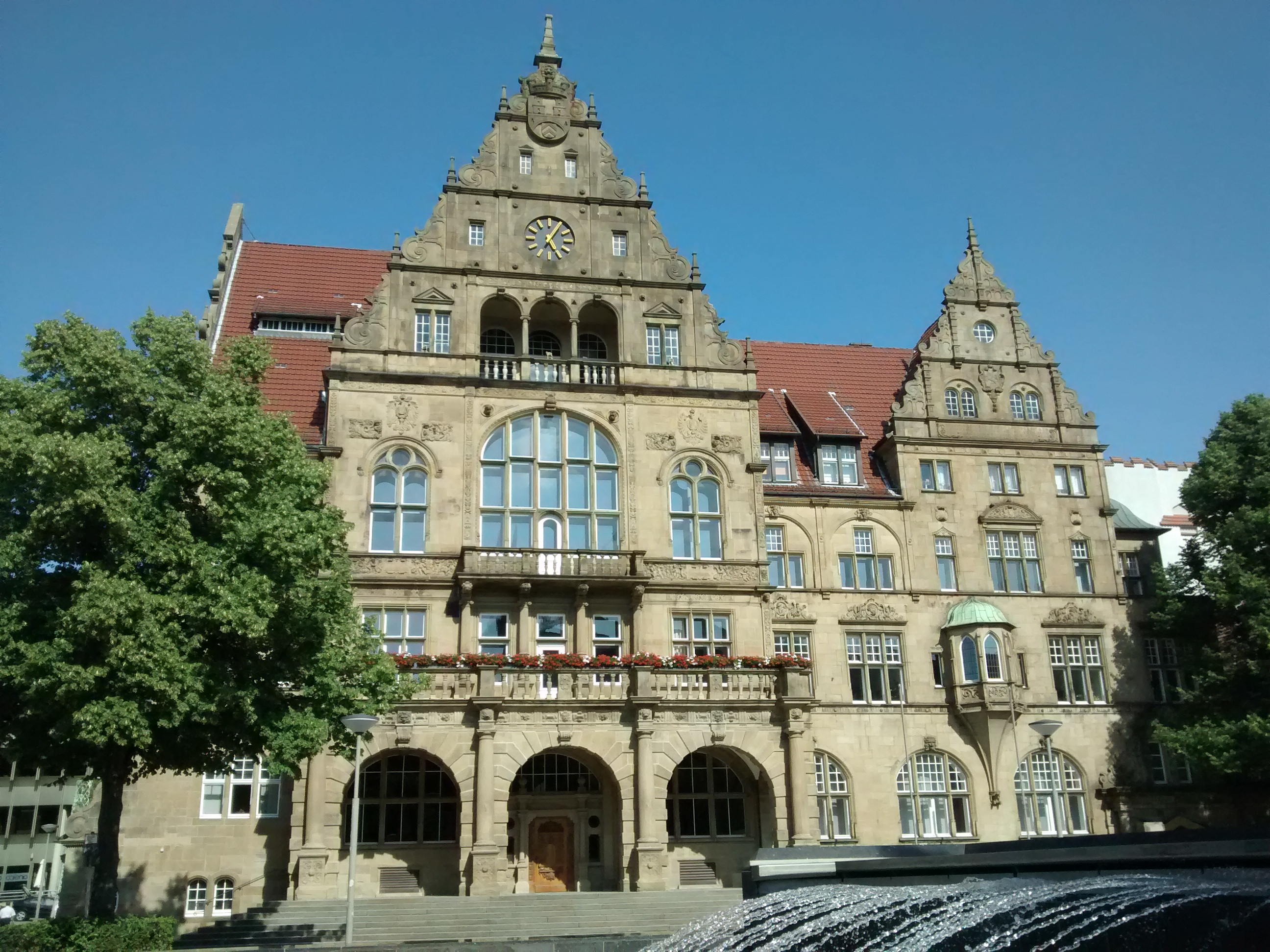
Old Town Hall in Bielefeld (1904)

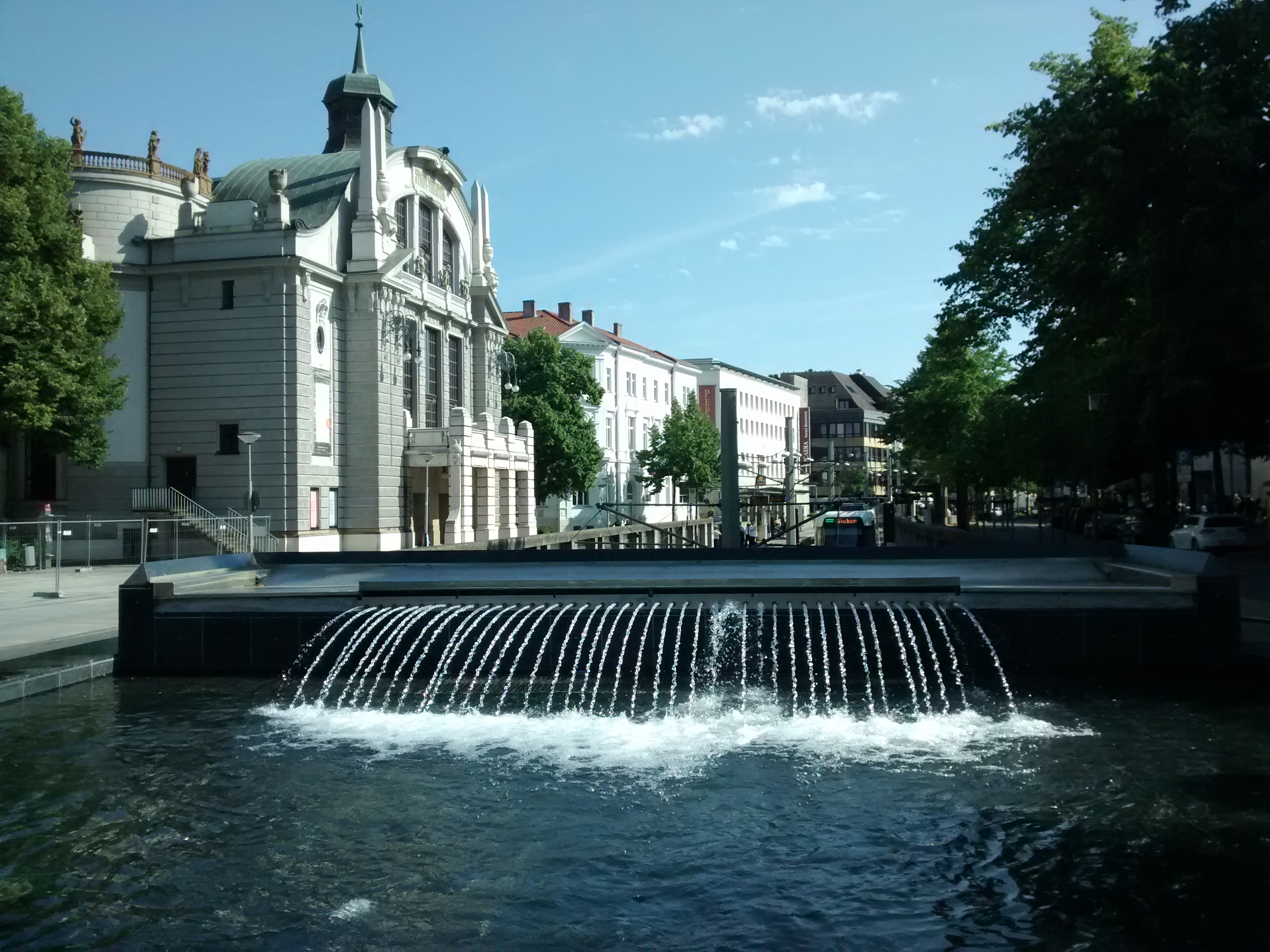
Bielefeld City

Founded in 1214 by Count Hermann IV of Ravensberg to guard a pass crossing the Teutoburg Forest, Bielefeld was the "city of linen" as a minor member of the Hanseatic League, known for bleachfields into the 19th century. The Peace of Westphalia in 1648 turned Ravensberg, from 1719 Minden-Ravensberg, into a part of Brandenburg–Prussia. When Prussia lost its western territories to French control in 1807, Bielefeld became part of the Kingdom of Westphalia. In 1813 the region reverted back to the Kingdom of Prussia, and following the defeat of France and the Congress of Vienna in 1815 Bielefeld was incorporated into the newly formed Province of Westphalia.

After the Cologne-Minden railway opened in 1849, the Bozi brothers constructed the first large mechanised spinning mill in 1851. The Ravensberg Spinning Mill was built from 1854 to 1857, and metal works began to open in the 1860s.

Founded in 1867 as a Bielefeld sewing machine repair company, Dürkoppwerke AG employed 1,665 people in 1892; it used Waffenamt code "WaA547" from 1938 to 1939 as the Dürkopp-Werke, and merged with other Bielefeld companies to form Dürkopp Adler AG in 1990.

Between 1904 and 1930, Bielefeld grew, opening a rebuilt railway station, a municipal theatre, and finally, the Rudolf-Oetker-Halle concert hall, renowned for its excellent acoustics. The Dürkopp car was produced from 1898 to 1927. After printing emergency money (German: Notgeld) in 1923 during the inflation in the Weimar Republic, Bielefeld was one of several towns that printed very attractive and highly collectable banknotes with designs on silk, linen and velvet. These pieces were issued by the Bielefeld Stadtsparkasse (town's savings bank) and were sent all around the world in the early 1920s. These pieces are known as Stoffgeld – that is, money made from fabric.

The town's synagogue was burned in 1938 during the Kristallnacht pogrom carried out against Jewish population. In 1944, Boeing B-17 Flying Fortresses of the USAAF bombed the gas works at Bielefeld on 20 September and the marshaling yard on 30 September; Bielefeld was bombed again on 7 October and the RAF bombed the town on the night of 4/5 December. On 17 January 1945, B-17s bombed the nearby Paderborn marshalling yard, and the railway viaduct in the suburb of Schildesche. On 14 March the RAF bombed the viaduct again, wrecking it. This was the first use of the RAF's 10 tonne Grand Slam bomb. American troops entered the city in April 1945.

Due to the presence of a number of barracks built during the 1930s and its location next to the main East-West Autobahn in northern Germany, after World War II Bielefeld became a headquarters town for the fighting command of the British Army of the Rhine – BAOR (the administrative and strategic headquarters were at Rheindahlen near the Dutch border). Until the 1980s there was a large British presence in the barracks housing the headquarters of the British First Corps and support units, as well as schools, NAAFI shops, officers' and sergeants' messes and several estates of married quarters. The British presence was heavily scaled back after the reunification of Germany and most of the infrastructure has disappeared, with the final departure in 2020.

As a part of larger municipal reforms in North Rhine-Westphalia, the city of Bielefeld was merged with the surrounding district of Bielefeld to form the “district-free city” of Bielefeld on 1 January 1973. This created the administrative structures and borders that the city has to this day. For the first time, Bielefeld was extended to the south side of the Teutoburg Forest. The city’s population rose from 167,000 to 320,000 and its area increased more than five-fold, from 48 to 259 km².

Starting in 1994, the city has been the subject of the humorous Bielefeld conspiracy, which satirises conspiracy theories by claiming that the city does not exist.

== Subdivisions ==
Bielefeld is subdivided into the following ten (10) districts:

- Bielefeld-Mitte (central district)
- Brackwede
- Dornberg
- Gadderbaum
- Heepen
- Jöllenbeck
- Schildesche
- Senne
- Sennestadt
- Stieghorst

== Climate ==
Bielefeld has an oceanic climate (Köppen: Cfb; Trewartha: Dobk). The average annual high temperature is 14.6 °C (58.3 °F), the annual low temperature is 5.4 °C (41.7 °F), and the annual precipitation is 866.4 millimetres (34.11 inches).

The Alzey weather station has recorded the following extreme values:

- Its highest temperature was 39.0 °C (102.2 °F) on 25 July 2019.
- Its lowest temperature was −21.3 °C (−6.3 °F) on 13 February 2021.
- Its greatest annual precipitation was 1,466.2 mm (57.72 in) in 2023.
- Its least annual precipitation was 652.6 mm (25.69 in) in 2018.
- The longest annual sunshine was 1,918.3 hours in 2022.
- The shortest annual sunshine was 1,418.4 hours in 2013.

Climate data for Bielefeld (1991–2020 normals, extremes 2006–present)
Month	Jan	Feb	Mar	Apr	May	Jun	Jul	Aug	Sep	Oct	Nov	Dec	Year
Record high °C (°F)	16.4 (61.5)	19.2 (66.6)	24.5 (76.1)	27.4 (81.3)	30.1 (86.2)	34.7 (94.5)	39.0 (102.2)	36.9 (98.4)	33.3 (91.9)	27.2 (81.0)	20.0 (68.0)	17.4 (63.3)	39.0 (102.2)
Mean maximum °C (°F)	11.6 (52.9)	12.3 (54.1)	18.5 (65.3)	24.1 (75.4)	26.6 (79.9)	30.9 (87.6)	33.4 (92.1)	32.7 (90.9)	27.8 (82.0)	22.3 (72.1)	16.5 (61.7)	12.6 (54.7)	35.0 (95.0)
Mean daily maximum °C (°F)	4.9 (40.8)	6.0 (42.8)	9.9 (49.8)	15.5 (59.9)	18.7 (65.7)	22.1 (71.8)	24.3 (75.7)	24.0 (75.2)	19.8 (67.6)	14.5 (58.1)	9.3 (48.7)	6.1 (43.0)	14.6 (58.3)
Daily mean °C (°F)	2.6 (36.7)	2.9 (37.2)	5.6 (42.1)	9.8 (49.6)	13.0 (55.4)	16.4 (61.5)	18.2 (64.8)	18.0 (64.4)	14.3 (57.7)	10.5 (50.9)	6.5 (43.7)	3.9 (39.0)	10.1 (50.2)
Mean daily minimum °C (°F)	−0.1 (31.8)	−0.2 (31.6)	1.2 (34.2)	3.5 (38.3)	6.6 (43.9)	10.3 (50.5)	11.9 (53.4)	12.0 (53.6)	9.0 (48.2)	6.6 (43.9)	3.5 (38.3)	1.3 (34.3)	5.4 (41.7)
Mean minimum °C (°F)	−8.9 (16.0)	−7.5 (18.5)	−5.0 (23.0)	−2.6 (27.3)	0.0 (32.0)	4.8 (40.6)	6.5 (43.7)	6.7 (44.1)	2.8 (37.0)	−0.4 (31.3)	−3.7 (25.3)	−6.2 (20.8)	−11.1 (12.0)
Record low °C (°F)	−20.2 (−4.4)	−21.3 (−6.3)	−14.7 (5.5)	−5.6 (21.9)	−1.5 (29.3)	0.8 (33.4)	4.7 (40.5)	5.2 (41.4)	−0.3 (31.5)	−4.4 (24.1)	−9.1 (15.6)	−20.0 (−4.0)	−21.3 (−6.3)
Average precipitation mm (inches)	101.5 (4.00)	69.3 (2.73)	62.9 (2.48)	35.2 (1.39)	64.7 (2.55)	71.5 (2.81)	72.7 (2.86)	83.0 (3.27)	60.1 (2.37)	70.7 (2.78)	78.2 (3.08)	96.7 (3.81)	866.4 (34.11)
Average extreme snow depth cm (inches)	5.8 (2.3)	2.7 (1.1)	1.3 (0.5)	0 (0)	0 (0)	0 (0)	0 (0)	0 (0)	0 (0)	0 (0)	0.9 (0.4)	4.9 (1.9)	8.8 (3.5)
Average precipitation days (≥ 0.1 mm)	20.8	16.7	15.7	12.1	14.3	14.6	16.7	16.5	14.0	16.7	18.6	21.6	198.3
Average relative humidity (%)	87.1	82.8	77.5	72.3	74.0	75.6	74.1	75.5	80.8	85.3	87.9	87.7	80.0
Mean monthly sunshine hours	40.8	69.2	134.0	181.6	217.9	216.1	220.1	200.4	149.0	100.5	54.0	33.8	1,617.3
Source: Deutscher Wetterdienst / SKlima.de

== Industry and education ==
Bielefeld was a linen-producing town, and in the early 1920s the Town's Savings Bank (Stadtsparkasse) issued money made of linen, silk and velvet. These items were known as 'stoffgeld'.

In addition to the manufacture of home appliances and various heavy industries, Bielefeld companies include Dr. Oetker (food manufacturing), Möller Group (leather products and plastics), Seidensticker (clothing and textiles) and Bethel Institution with 17.000 employees.

Bielefeld University was founded in 1969. The first professors included the well-known German sociologist Niklas Luhmann. Other institutions of higher education include the Theological Seminary Bethel (Kirchliche Hochschule Bethel) and the Bielefeld University of Applied Sciences (German: Hochschule Bielefeld), which offers 21 courses in 8 different departments (agriculture and engineering are in Minden) and has been internationally recognized for its photography school. Bielefeld has several vocational schools like Berufskolleg Senne. and Berufskolleg Bethel. These schools focus on hands-on training in various fields, including business, healthcare, and technical disciplines.

== Demographics ==
Historical population

Year	Pop.	±% p.a.
1510	2,500	—
1718	2,967	+0.08%
1811	5,613	+0.69%
1871	21,803	+2.29%
1900	63,046	+3.73%
1919	79,049	+1.20%
1925	86,062	+1.43%
1933	121,031	+4.35%
1939	129,466	+1.13%
1946	132,276	+0.31%
1961	175,517	+1.90%
1965	309,789	+15.26%

Year	Pop.	±% p.a.
1970	317,428	+0.49%
1975	316,065	−0.09%
1980	312,715	−0.21%
1985	299,738	−0.84%
1990	319,037	+1.26%
1995	324,066	+0.31%
2000	321,758	−0.14%
2005	326,925	+0.32%
2010	323,270	−0.22%
2015	333,090	+0.60%
2020	333,509	+0.03%
2025	331,419	−0.13%

Source: Landesdatabank Nordrhein-Westfalen (1965-2025)

Largest groups of foreign residents (excluding persons with dual citizenship)
Nationality	Population (August 2025)
Turkey	11,096
Iraq	6,196
Ukraine	5,410
Syria	4,113
Greece	3,766
Poland	3,461

Population development since 1871

== Politics ==
=== Mayor ===
The current mayor (Oberbürgermeister) of Bielefeld is Christiana Bauer of the Christian Democratic Union (CDU), who was elected in 2025.

The most recent mayoral election was held on 14 September 2025, with a runoff held on 28 September, and the results were as follows:

Candidate	Party	First round		Second round	
Candidate	Party	Votes	%	Votes	%
Christiana Bauer	Christian Democratic Union	47,263	33.0	56,872	51.4
Ingo Nürnberger	Social Democratic Party	43,403	30.3	53,825	48.6
Florian Sander	Alternative for Germany	16,040	11.2		
Dominic Hallau	Alliance 90/The Greens	12,455	8.7		
Onur Ocak	The Left	12,452	8.7		
Jasmin Wahl-Schwentker	Free Democratic Party	5,954	4.2		
Lena Oberbäumer	Die PARTEI	2,251	1.6		
Michael Gugat	Local Democracy in Bielefeld	1,547	1.1		
Melahat Barlak	Alliance for Innovation and Justice	896	0.6		
Nicole Reese	Lobbyists for Children	879	0.6		
Valid votes		143,140	99.6	110,697	99.4
Invalid votes		544	0.4	706	0.6
Total		143,684	100.0	111,403	100.0
Electorate/voter turnout		250,486	57.4	250,486	44.5
Source: State Returning Officer

=== City council ===
The Bielefeld city council governs the city alongside the mayor. The most recent city council election was held on 14 September 2025. The SPD and the CDU formed a coalition with 40 of the 78 seats in the council. The full results were as follows:

Party	Votes	%	+/-	Seats	+/-
Christian Democratic Union (CDU)	41,977	29.4	▲1.6	23	▲5
Social Democratic Party (SPD)	31,063	21.7	▼3.2	17	▲1
Alliance 90/The Greens (Grüne)	21,488	15.0	▼7.3	12	▼3
Alternative for Germany (AfD)	17,370	12.2	▲8.7	10	▲8
The Left (Die Linke)	15,023	10.5	▲4.4	8	▲4
Free Democratic Party (FDP)	6,813	4.8	▼2.3	4	▼1
Die PARTEI (PARTEI)	2,325	1.6	▼1.3	1	▼1
Sahra Wagenknecht Alliance (BSW)	1,768	1.2	New	1	New
Volt (Volt)	1,759	1.2	New	1	New
Local Democracy in Bielefeld (LiB)	1,582	1.1	▲0.2	1	±0
Alliance for Innovation and Justice (BIG)	945	0.7	▼0.3	0	▼1
Close to the Citizens (Bürgernähe)	735	0.5	▼0.7	0	▼1
Lobbyists for Children (LfK)	72	0.1	New	0	New
Valid votes	142,920	99.5			
Invalid votes	784	0.6			
Total	143,704	100.0		78	▲12
Electorate/voter turnout	250,486	57.4	▲3.8		
Source: City of Bielefeld

== Transport ==
Two major autobahns, the A 2 and A 33, intersect in the south east of Bielefeld. The Ostwestfalendamm expressway connects the two parts of the city, naturally divided by the Teutoburg Forest. Bielefeld Hauptbahnhof, the main railway station of Bielefeld, is on the Hamm–Minden railway and is part of the German ICE high-speed railroad system. The main station for intercity bus services is Brackwede station.

Bielefeld has a small airstrip, Flugplatz Bielefeld, in the Senne district but is mainly served by the three larger airports nearby, Paderborn Lippstadt Airport, Münster Osnabrück Airport and Hannover Airport.

Bielefeld boasts a well-developed public transport system, served mainly by the companies moBiel (formerly Stadtwerke Bielefeld – Verkehrsbetriebe) and "BVO". The Bielefeld Stadtbahn has four major lines and regional trains connect different parts of the city with nearby counties. Buses also run throughout the area.

== Main sights ==
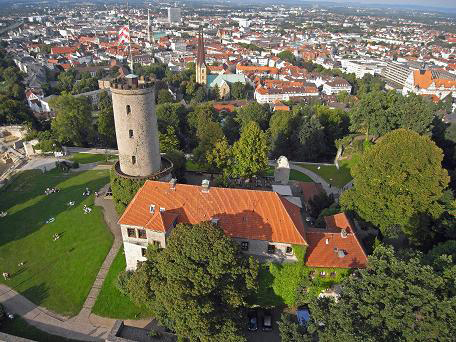
Sparrenburg Castle

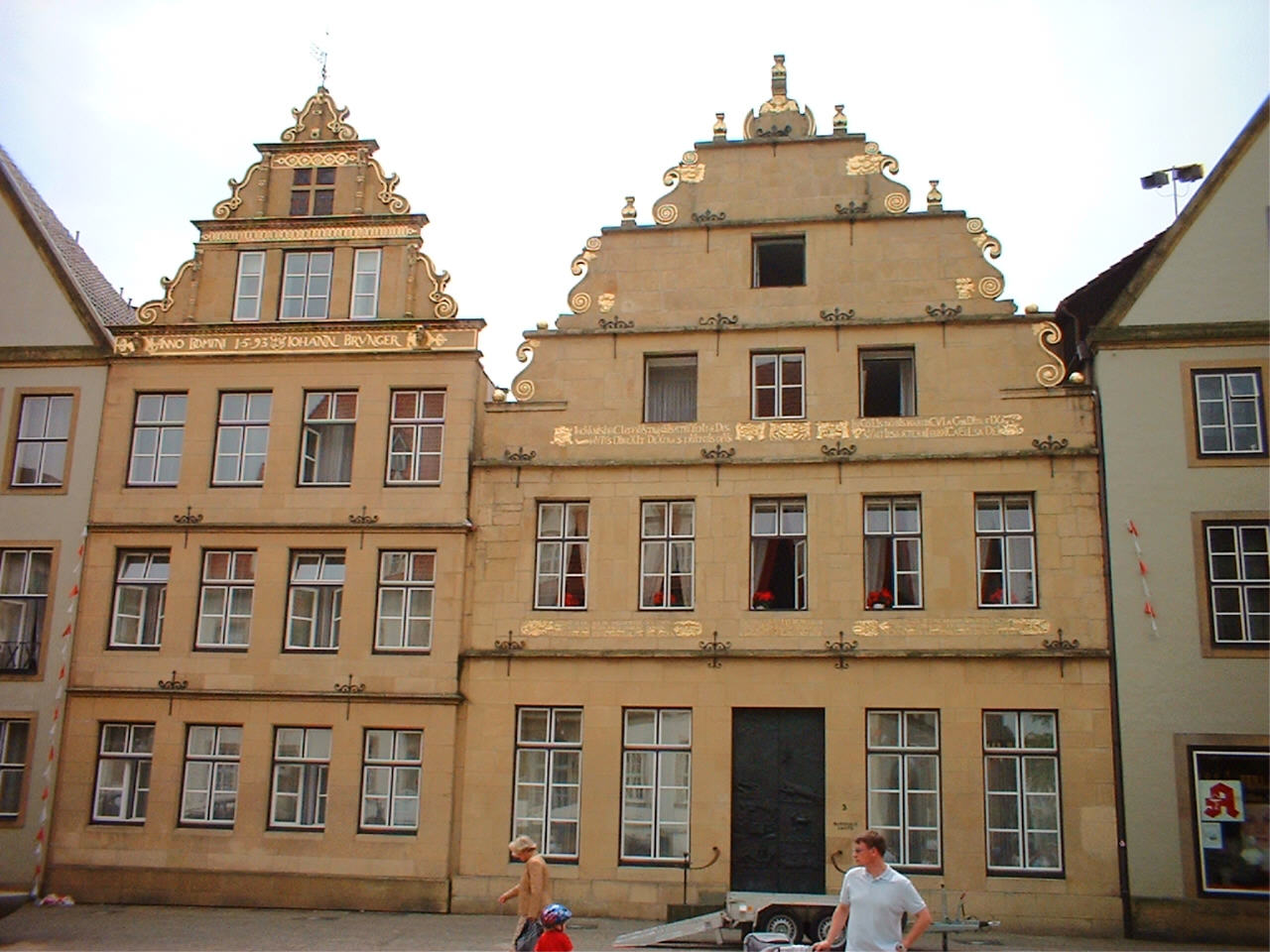
Old Market Place (Alter Markt)

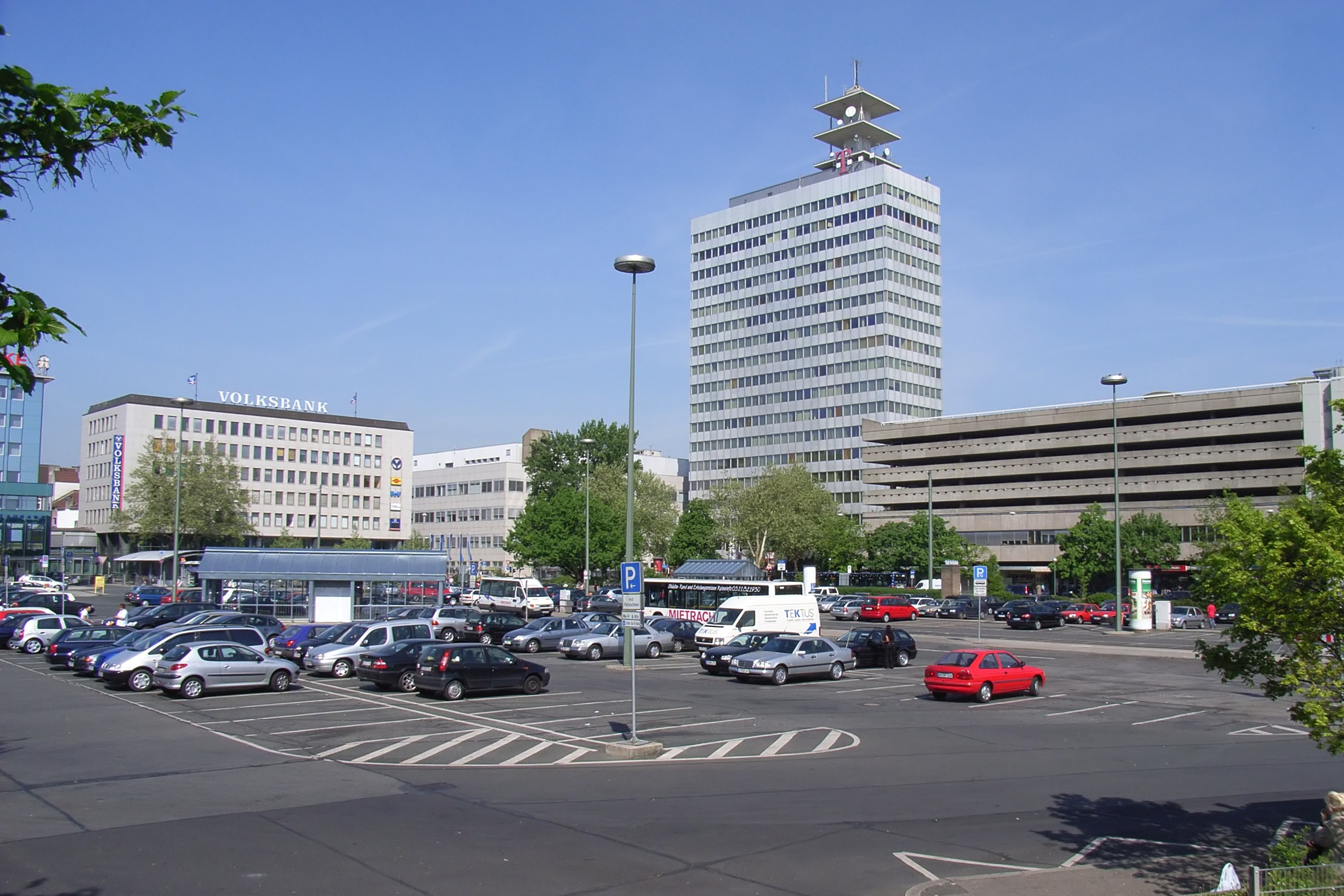
The Kesselbrink outside the Old Town

Sparrenburg Castle is Bielefeld's characteristic landmark. It was built between 1240 and 1250 by Count Ludwig von Ravensberg. The 37-metre-high (121 ft) tower and the catacombs of the castle are open to the public.

The Linen Weavers' Monument, with the German name Leineweber-Denkmal, created by the Tyrolean sculptor Perathoner, has been one of Bielefeld's most recognisable symbols for over 100 years. It stands as a reminder of the time when the city gained importance through the production of linen, with the traditional crafts of spinning and weaving, and its high-quality linen became known worldwide, characterised by its own seal of quality.

The Old City Hall (Altes Rathaus) was built in 1904 and still serves the same function. Its façade reflects the so-called Weserrenaissance and features elements of various architectural styles, including Gothic and Renaissance. Though the mayor still holds office in the Old City Hall, most of the city's administration is housed in the adjacent New City Hall (Neues Rathaus).

The City Theatre (Stadttheater) is part of the same architectural ensemble as the Old City Hall, also built in 1904. It has a notable Jugendstil façade, is Bielefeld's largest theatre and home of the Bielefeld Opera. Another theatre (Theater am Alten Markt) resides in the former town hall building on the Old Market Square (Alter Markt), which also contains a row of restored 16th and 17th-century townhouses with noteworthy late Gothic and Weser Renaissance style façades (Bürgerhäuser am Alten Markt).

The oldest city church is Altstädter Nicolaikirche. It is a Gothic hall church with a height of 81.5 m (267 ft). It was founded in 1236 by the Bishop of Paderborn, and enlarged at the beginning of the 14th century. The church was damaged in World War II and later rebuilt. Three times a day, a carillon can be heard. The most valuable treasure of this church is a carved altar from Antwerp, decorated with 250 figures. A small museum housed within illustrates the history of the church up to World War II.

The largest church is the Neustädter Marienkirche, a Gothic hall church dating back to 1293, completed 1512. It stands 78 m (256 ft) tall and has a length of 52 m (171 ft). Historically speaking, this building is considered to be the most precious possession of the town. It was the starting point of the Protestant Reformation in Bielefeld in 1553. A valuable wing-altar with 13 pictures, known as the Marienaltar is also kept inside. The baroque spires were destroyed in World War II and later replaced by two unusually-shaped "Gothic" clocktowers. The altarpiece of the Bielefeld church Neustädter Marienkirche from around 1400 is among the most prominent masterpieces of artwork of the German Middle Ages. Two of the altarpieces, The Flagellation and The Crucifixion are now in the collection of the Metropolitan Museum of Art in New York.

Bielefeld is also the seat of the two largest Protestant social welfare establishments (Diakonie) in Europe, the Bethel Institution and the Evangelisches Johanneswerk.

Other important cultural sights of the region are the art museum (Kunsthalle), the Rudolf-Oetker-Halle concert hall, the city's municipal botanical garden (Botanischer Garten Bielefeld) and the Olderdissen Heimat-Zoo, a zoological garden based on German wildlife. Bielefeld is home to the widely known Bielefelder Kinderchor, founded in 1932 by Friedrich Oberschelp as the first mixed children's choir in Germany. It became famous for its recordings and concerts of traditional German Christmas carols, filling the Rudolf-Oetker-Halle several times each season. Foreign tours have taken the choir to many European countries, and also the U.S. and Japan.

On Hünenburg there is an observation tower, next to a 164-metre-high (538 ft) radio tower.

== Sport ==
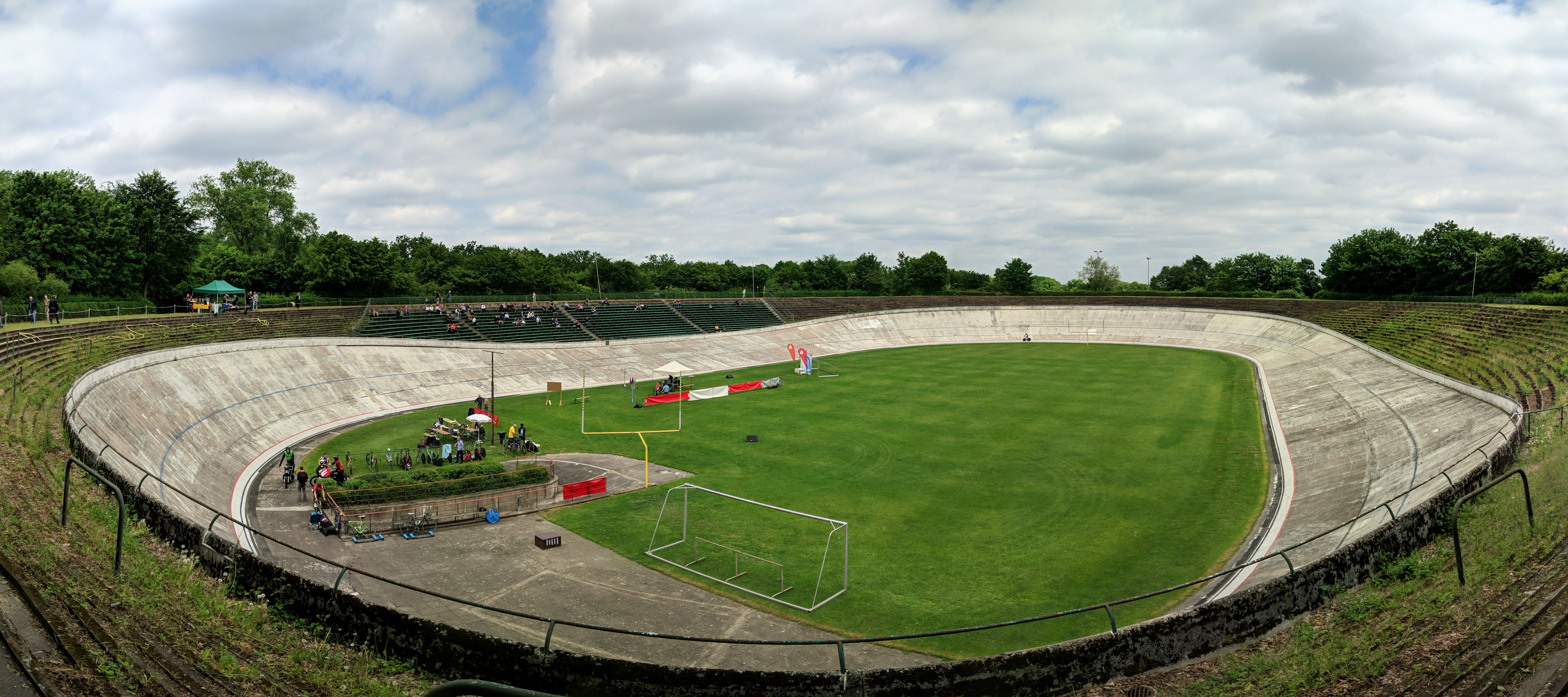
Radrennbahn Bielefeld (2019)

Bielefeld is home to the professional football team DSC Arminia Bielefeld. Currently a member of the 2. Liga in the 2025–26 season, the club plays at the SchücoArena stadium in the west of the town centre.

Bielefeld is home to the Radrennbahn Bielefeld bike racing track.

== Notable people ==
=== Born before 1900 ===
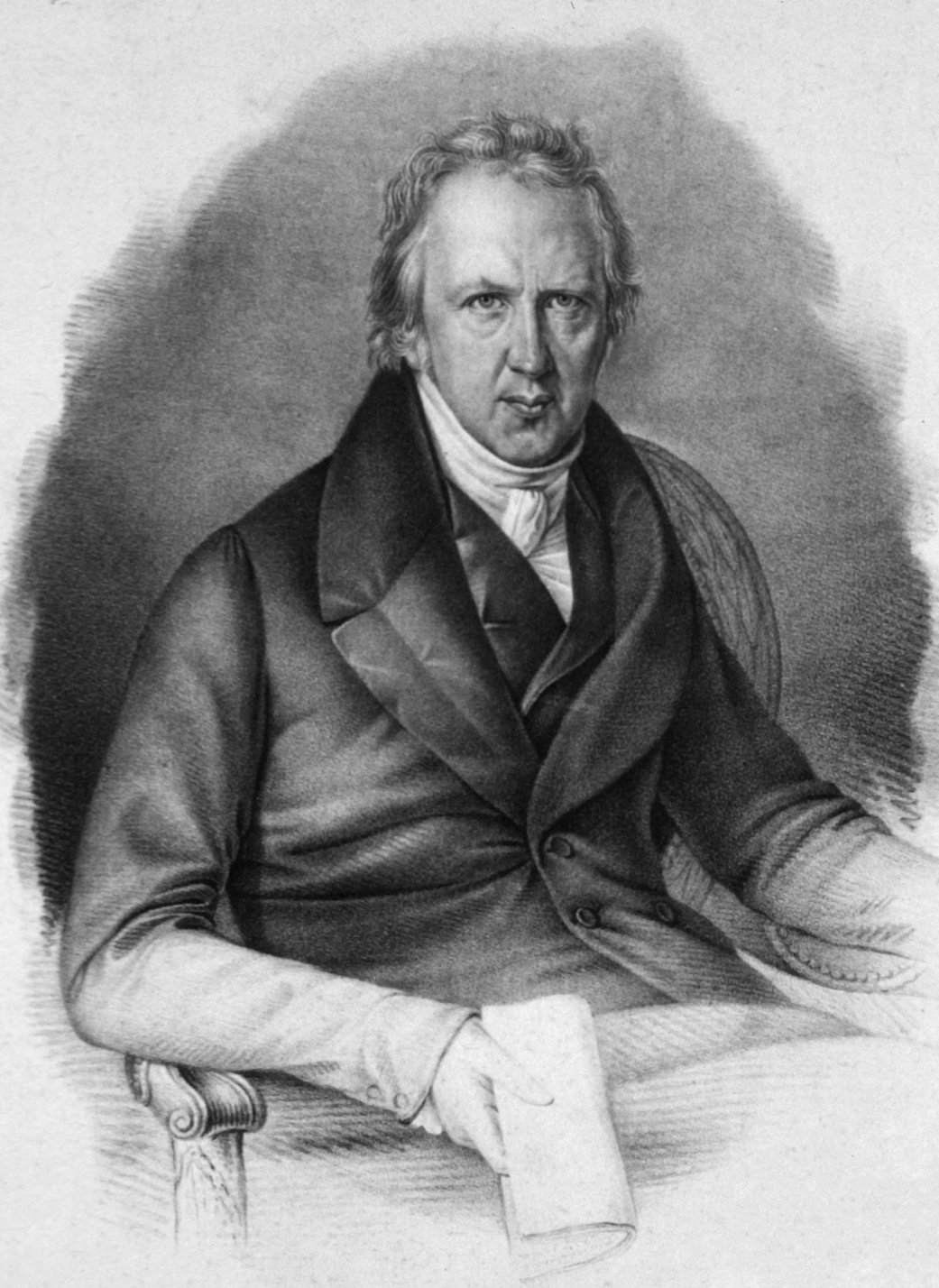
Christian Friedrich Nasse

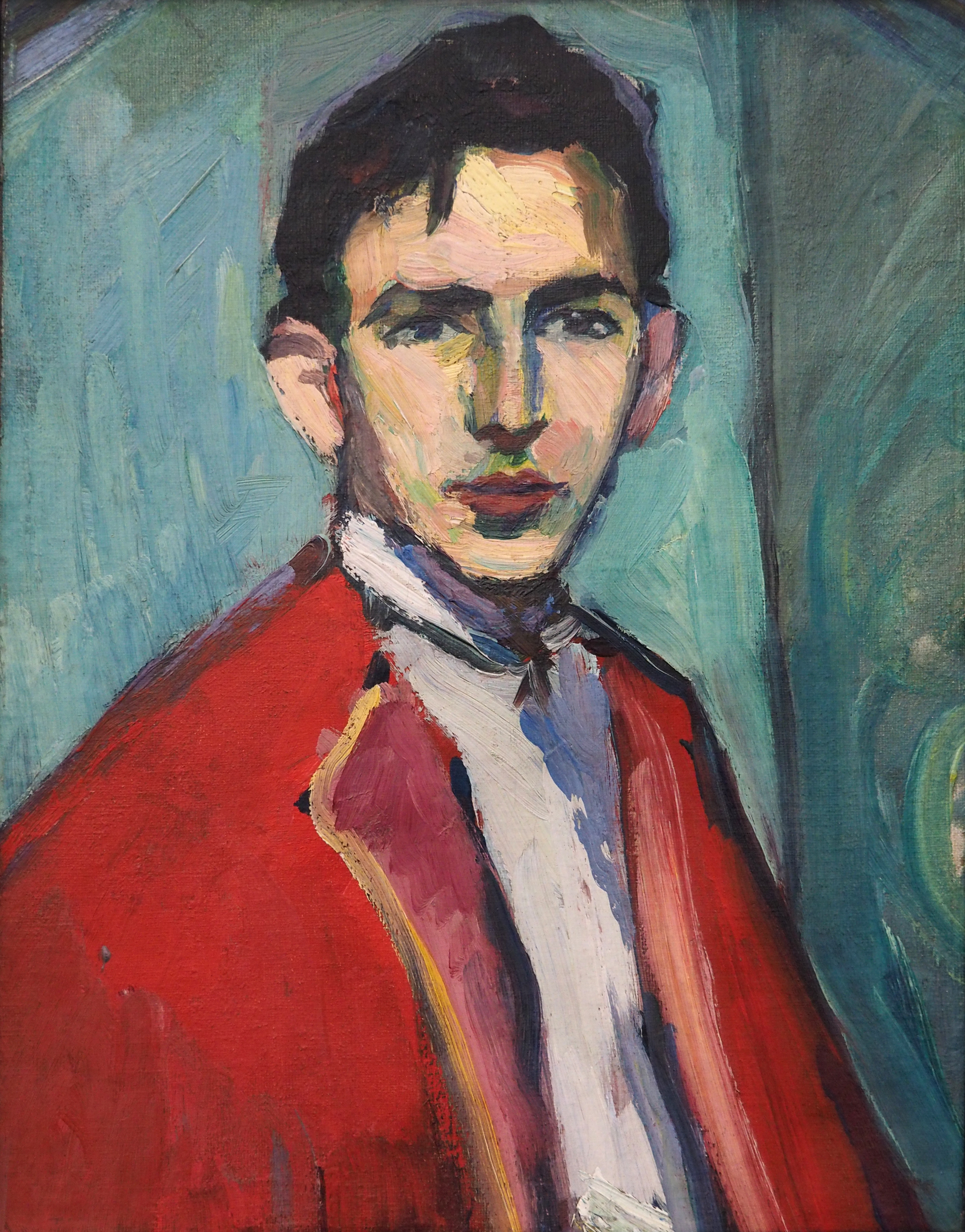
Self-portrait Hermann Stenner 1911

- Kurt Blome (1894–1969), high-ranking Nazi scientist before and during World War II
- Friedrich von Bodelschwingh, Senior (1831–1910), second boss of the "Evangelischen Heil- und Pflegeanstalt für Epileptische" (Protestant Sanatorium for Epileptics) (1874 renamed into "Bethel")
- Friedrich von Bodelschwingh (1877–1946) (named after F. v. Bodelschwingh Senior), Protestant theologian, third boss of the von Bodelschwinghsche Anstalten (later renamed into von Bodelschwinghsche Stiftungen)
- Hugo Fischer-Köppe (1890–1937), early film actor
- Albert Florath (1888–1957), stage and film actor
- Anne Marie Heiler (1889–1979), politician (CDU)
- Johann Christoph Hoffbauer (1766–1827), philosopher
- Alexander Holle (1898–1978), general lieutenant in the Luftwaffe's Condor Legion
- Charlotte Houtermans (1899–1993), physicist, physical chemistry
- August Junkermann (1832–1915), actor
- August Krönig (1822–1879), chemist and physicist
- Wilhelmine Lohmann (1872-?), German teacher, social worker, and temperance leader
- Friedrich Wilhelm Murnau (1888–1931), film director
- Christian Friedrich Nasse (1778–1851), psychiatrist
- Helmuth Osthoff (1896–1983), musicologist and composer
- Rainer Stahel (1892–1955), military officer and war criminal
- Viktoria Steinbiß (1892–1971), politician (CDU)
- Hermann Stenner (1891–1914), early Expressionist painter
- Hermann Dietrich Upmann (1816–1894), banker, merchant and cigar manufacturer in Cuba
- Franz von Waldeck (≈1491–1553), prince-bishop of Münster, Osnabrück, and Minden
- Roger Wilmans (1812–1881), historian and archivist

=== Born 1900–1950 ===
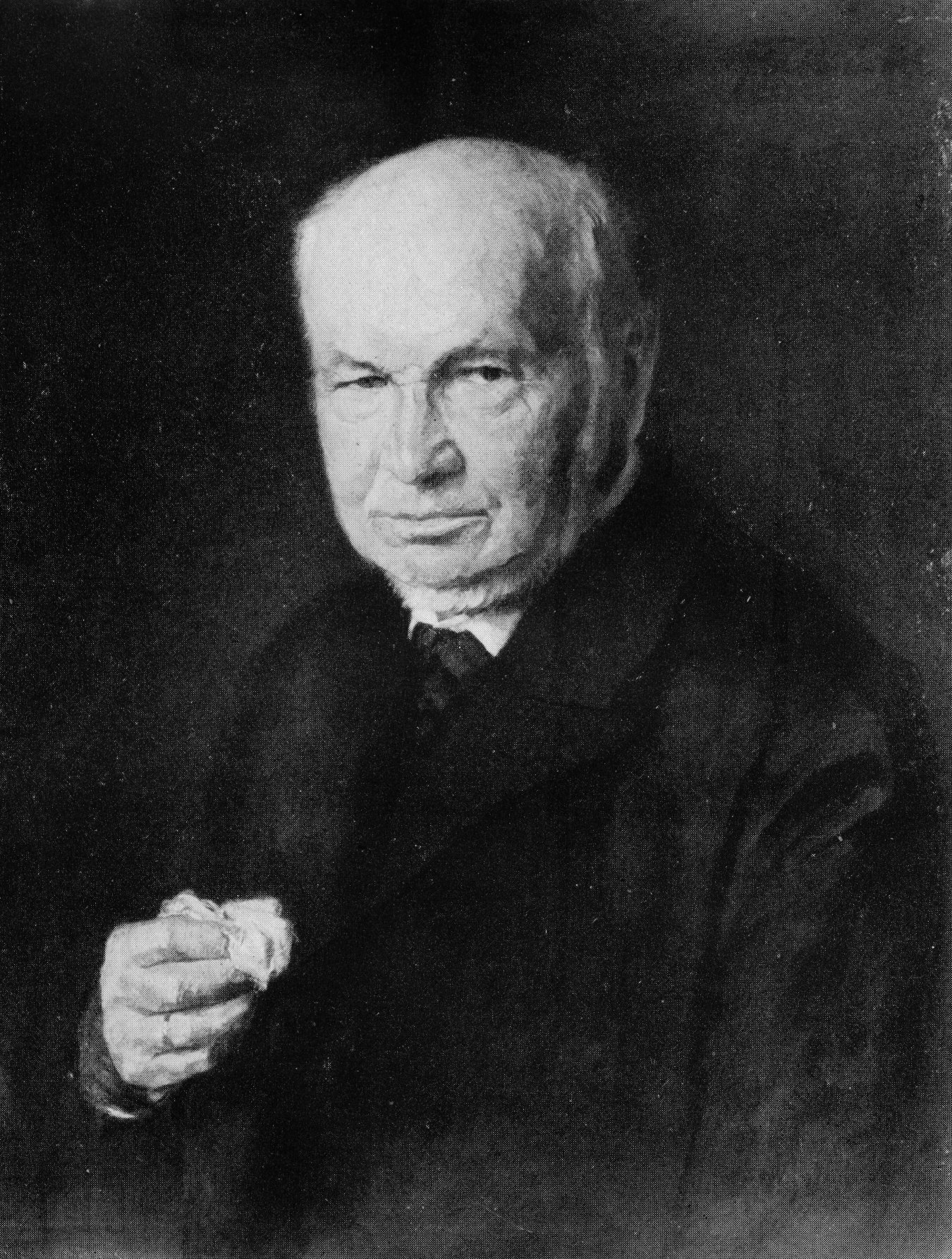
Friedrich von Bodelschwingh

- Rudolph Angermüller (1940–2021), musicologist
- Aleida Assmann (born 1947), anglist, egyptologist and literary and cultural scientist
- Veronica Carstens (1923–2012), medical doctor, wife of Karl Carstens
- Erich Consemüller (1902–1957), Bauhaus-trained architect and photographer
- Elfriede Eilers (1921–2016), politician (SPD)
- Johannes Friedrich (1948–2025), Lutheran Protestant theologian
- Karen Gershon (1923–1993), German-born writer and poet
- Theodor Göllner (1929–2022), musicologist
- Klaus Hildebrand (born 1941), historian
- Friedrich Holzapfel (1900–1969), politician (CDU)
- Heinz Klingenberg (1905–1959), actor
- Klaus Kobusch (1941–2025), cyclist
- Werner Lueg (1931–2014), athlete
- Hajo Meyer (1924–2014), German-Dutch physicist and author
- Reinhard Meyer zu Bentrup (1939–2024), politician (CDU)
- Irmgard Möller (born 1947), member of the Red Army faction
- Hermann Paul Müller (1909–1975), racing driver
- Rüdiger Nehberg (1935–2020), survival expert and activist for human rights
- Jürgen Oberschelp (born 1938), conductor and choir director
- Ursula Oetker (1915–2005), businesswoman
- Günther Pankoke (1925–1999), racing cyclist
- Heinz Pauck (1904–1986), screenwriter
- Walter Quakernack (1907–1946), Oberscharführer in the SS during the Nazi era and war criminal
- Günter Rixe (1939–2024), politician (SPD)
- Klaus Ruedenberg (born 1920), chemist
- Bernhard Schlink (born 1944), professor of jurisprudence and author
- Hans-Werner Sinn (born 1948), economist and president of the Ifo Institute for Economic Research
- Christian Tümpel (1937–2009), art historian
- Reiner Uthoff (1937–2024), writer and stage director
- Werner Vordtriede (1915–1985), emigrant, professor of German language and literature, writer
- Hannes Wader (born 1942), musician and songwriter
- Karl August Walther (1902–after 1964) writer and publisher
- Horst Wessel (1907–1930), SA leader, author of the Horst-Wessel-Song
- Ulrich Wessel (1946–1975), member of the Red Army Faction
- Ulrich Wildgruber (1937–1999), actor

=== Born 1951–2000 ===
- Julia Abe (born 1976), tennis player
- Friederike Abt (born 1994), football goalkeeper
- Mehmet Akgün (born 1986), footballer
- Dirk Becker (born 1966), politician (SPD)
- Anja Blacha (born 1990), endurance and extreme athlete, high-altitude mountaineer
- Tom Brüntrup (born 1997), politician (CDU)
- Ulrich Büscher (1958–2020), footballer
- Mark Carleton-Smith (born 1964), senior British Army officer
- Charalampos Chantzopoulos (born 1994), Greek football player
- Michael Diekmann (born 1954), chief executive officer of Allianz SE
- Hendrik Dreekmann (born 1975), tennis player
- Joachim Ebmeyer (born 1985), politician (CDU)
- Kevin John Edusei (born 1976), conductor
- Ralf Ehrenbrink (born 1960), versatility rider
- Sabine Ellerbrock (born 1975), wheelchair tennis player
- Wiebke Esdar (born 1984), politician (SPD)
- Anja Feldmann (born 1966), computer scientist
- Nils Fischer (born 1987), footballer
- Moritz Fritz (born 1993), footballer
- Baboucarr Gaye (born 1998), footballer and goalkeeper
- Frank Geideck (born 1967), footballer
- Nina George (born 1973), writer and journalist
- Wolfram Goessling (born 1967), physician-scientist, specializes in oncology and gastroenterology
- Maja Göpel (born 1976), political economist, sustainability scientist
- Lena Goeßling (born 1986), women's association football player for Germany women's national football team
- Annette Groth (born 1954), politician (The Left)
- Berkant Güner (born 1998), footballer
- Olaf Hampel (born 1965), bob driver
- Ruediger Heining (born 1968), agricultural scientist and economist
- Maximilian Hippe (born 1998), footballer
- Marco Hober (born 1995), footballer
- Marvin Höner (born 1994), footballer
- Stefan Hübner (born 1975), volleyball player
- Josef Ivanović (born 1973), football coach and a former player
- Nadine Jarosch (born 1995), gymnast
- Rolf Kanies (born 1957), film and theater actor
- Denis Kina (born 1992), footballer
- Jost Kobusch (born 1992), mountaineer and author
- Julian Köster (born 2000), handball player, German national team
- Serhat Kot (born 1997), footballer
- Mieke Kröger (born 1993), cyclist
- Markus Kullig (born 1974), footballer
- Fabian Kunze (born 1998), footballer
- Lukas Kunze (born 1998), footballer
- Gitta Kutyniok (born 1972), mathematician
- Karoline Linnert (born 1958), politician (The Greens)
- Julia Lohoff (born 1994), tennis player
- Ingolf Lück (born 1958), actor, synchronizer, presenter, comedian and director
- Erich Marks (born 1954), educator
- Andreas K. W. Meyer (1958–2023), dramaturge, journalist, librettist and opera manager
- Lisa Middelhauve (born 1980), metal singer
- Ingo Niermann (born 1969), writer, journalist and artist
- Richard Oetker (born 1951), entrepreneur Dr. Oetker
- Ingo Oschmann (born 1969), comedian, entertainer and magician
- Hartmut Ostrowski (born 1958), chief executive officer of Bertelsmann AG
- Can Özkan (born 1999), footballer
- Uğur Pamuk (born 1989), footballer
- Florian Panzner (born 1976), actor
- Dinah Pfizenmaier (born 1992), tennis player
- Mateusz Przybylko (born 1992), high jumper
- Kacper Przybyłko (born 1993), footballer
- Christina Rau (born 1956), political scientist and widow of the Federal President Johannes Rau
- Mike Reed (born 1974), jazz drummer, bandleader, composer
- Markus Reitzig (born 1972), organizational scientist
- Hartmut Schick (born 1960), musicologist
- Bianca Shomburg (born 1974), singer, participation in the 1997 Eurovision Song Contest
- Keanu Staude (born 1997), footballer
- Melanie Stiassny (born 1953), ichthyologist
- Maike Stöckel (born 1984), field hockey player
- Maren Tellenbröker (born 2000), footballer
- Jens Teutrine (born 1993), politician (FDP)
- Aylin Tezel (born 1983), actress, writer and director
- Iris Vermillion (born 1960), operatic mezzo-soprano
- Henri Weigelt (born 1998), footballer
- Oliver Welke (born 1966), author, comedian, sports journalist and moderator
- Louis Weßels (born 1998), tennis player
- Christian Wieczorek (born 1985), footballer
- Susanne Wolff (born 1973), actress

=== Born 2001 and later ===
- Dildar Atmaca (born 2002), footballer
- Jomaine Consbruch (born 2002), footballer
- Colin Kleine-Bekel (born 2003), footballer
- Henrik Koch (born 2006), footballer

== Twin towns – sister cities ==
Bielefeld is twinned with:

- Concarneau, France
- Estelí, Nicaragua
- Nahariya, Israel
- Rochdale, England, United Kingdom
- Rzeszów, Poland
- Veliky Novgorod, Russia
