= German Congress on Crime Prevention =

The German Congress on Crime Prevention (Deutscher Präventionstag - DPT) is an international conference for the field of crime prevention that takes place annually since 1995 in different German cities.

== General Information ==
The aim of the German Congress on Crime Prevention (GCOCP) is to present and strengthen crime prevention within a broad societal framework. Thus it contributes to crime reduction as well as reducing both the fear of crime, and the number of victims of crime. As an annually organised congress, the main objectives of the Congress are:

- Presenting and exchanging current and basic questions of crime prevention and its effectiveness
- Bringing together partners within the field of crime prevention
- Functioning as a forum for the practice of crime prevention and for fostering the exchange of expertise
- Helping to get into contact at the international level and to exchange information
- Discussing implementation strategies
- Developing and disseminating recommendations for practice, politics, administration and research in the field of crime prevention

In 2007 the Annual International Forum (AIF) within the GCOCP was established to address an international audience and to share their experiences in crime prevention.

Both the GCOCP and AIF are geared to people from all over the world working in all areas of crime prevention: administration, health system, youth welfare, judiciary, churches, local authorities, media, politics, police, prevention committees, projects, schools, organizations and associations, science etc.

So far the following congresses took place:

- 1. GCOCP 1995 in Lübeck
- 2. GCOCP 1996 in Münster
- 3. GCOCP 1997 in Bonn
- 4. GCOCP 1998 in Bonn
- 5. GCOCP 1999 in Hoyerswerda
- 6. GCOCP 2000 in Düsseldorf
- 7. GCOCP 2001 in Düsseldorf
- 8. GCOCP 2003 in Hanover
- 9. GCOCP 2004 in Stuttgart
- 10. GCOCP 2005 in Hanover
- 11. GCOCP 2006 in Nuremberg
- 12. GCOCP and 1. AIF 2007 in Wiesbaden
- 13. GCOCP and 2. AIF 2008 in Leipzig
- 14. GCOCP and 3. AIF 2009 in Hanover
- 15. GCOCP and 4. AIF 2010 in Berlin
- 16. GCOCP and 5. AIF 2011 in Oldenburg
- 17. GCOCP and 6. AIF 2012 in Munich
- 18. GCOCP and 7. AIF 2013 in Bielefeld
- 19. GCOCP and 8. AIF 2014 in Karlsruhe
- 20. GCOCP and 9. AIF 2015 in Frankfurt am Main
- 21. GCOCP and 10. AIF 2016 in Magdeburg
- 22. GCOCP and 11. AIF 2017 in Hannover
- 23. GCOSP and 12. AIF 2018 in Dresden

== Organisation ==
The German Congress on Crime Prevention (GCOCP) on behalf of the German Foundation for Crime Prevention and Offender Support (DVS) is responsible for the organisation of the congress. Erich Marks is managing director of the GCOCP. Chairman of the DVS is Hans-Jürgen Kerner.

=== Partner ===
The GCOCP thrives on the commitment of the different organisations and institutes which participate as Congress Partners.

==== Permanent National Partners ====
- DBH
- German Forum for Crime Prevention (DFK)
- Police Crime Prevention at State and National Level (ProPK)
- The "White Ring" organisation

==== Permanent International Partners ====
- European Forum for Urban Security (EFUS)
- World Health Organization (WHO)
- UN-HABITAT
- Korean Institute of Criminology (KIC)

=== Programme Advisory Board ===
In preparation for each congress a programme advisory board shall be constituted where organiser and the permanent as well as the host program partners are represented. The programme advisory board is responsible for the content arrangement of the respective congress.Programme Advisory Board

== Literature ==
- Marc Coester / Erich Marks (Ed.): International Perspectives of Crime Prevention 4: Contributions from the 4th and the 5th Annual International Forum 2010 and 2011 within the German Congress on Crime Prevention, Mönchengladbach 2012
- Coester, Marc / Marks, Erich (Ed.): International Perspectives of Crime Prevention - Contributions from the 3rd Annual International Forum, Mönchengladbach 2010
- Erich Marks / Wiebke Steffen (Ed.): Engagierte Bürger - Sichere Gesellschaft. Ausgewählte Beiträge des 13. Deutschen Präventionstages (2.-3. Juni 2008, Leipzig), Mönchengladbach 2009
- Marc Coester / Erich Marks (Ed.): International Perspectives of Crime Prevention 2 - Contributions from the 2nd Annual International Forum 2008, Mönchengladbach 2009
- Erich Marks / Wiebke Steffen (Ed.): Starke Jugend - Starke Zukunft. Ausgewählte Beiträge des 12. Deutschen Präventionstages (18.-19. Juni 2007, Wiesbaden), Mönchengladbach 2008
- Marc Coester / Erich Marks (Ed.): International Perspectives of Crime Prevention - Contributions from the 1st International Forum, Mönchengladbach 2008
