= Werner Vordtriede =

German writer (1915–1985)

External image
- 1956 portrait photograph of Werner Vordtriede

Werner Vordtriede (18 March 1915 – 25 September 1985) was an emigre from Nazi Germany first to Switzerland and then to the United States who was a professor of German language and literature at the University of Wisconsin from 1947 to 1960 before returning to West Germany as a university professor at the Ludwig-Maximilians-Universität München. Beyond his scholarly publications, he translated and authored a number of fictional and non-fictional works.

== Early years in Germany ==
Vordtriede was born in Bielefeld to Käthe née Blumenthal (1891–1964) and Gustav Adolf Vordtriede (1882–1929), co-owner of a chocolate factory in Herford. His father's military service in World War I as well as his parents' separation in 1916 and subsequent divorce led to a relocation, first in 1922 to Todtmoos in the Black Forest and in 1923 to Freiburg im Breisgau, where he lived with his mother and his sister Fränze (1911–1997). His father, whom he never met, died in an accident in Herne in 1929. His mother was politically active and worked as a local editor of the SPD Volkswacht, one of five daily newspapers published in Freiburg at that time. His sister would later become a professor of English literature in the U.S. As a youngster, he was interested in German literature and corresponded with such literary luminaries as Kurt Tucholsky and Arthur Schnitzler. As a 16-year-old, he won a trip to Paris as a prize in an essay-writing contest. In 1933 he completed his secondary education at the Gymnasium in the Herdern district of Freiburg.

== Emigre years in Switzerland and the U.S. ==
Following the Nazi accession to power in 1933, Vordtriede emigrated to Switzerland, where in 1934 he was introduced to the German Jewish philosopher Edith Landmann in Basel and through her affiliated with the George Circle, even adopting George's distinctive calligraphy as his own handwriting style, e.g., with є instead of e. He matriculated at the University of Zurich in 1934 with a major in German philology and a minor in English philology, taking courses with such noted academics as Emil Ermatinger and Bernhard Fehr, an Oscar Wilde specialist. Prevented from seeking employment by the terms of his student visa, he managed to keep his head above water by working part-time as a private tutor and writing articles and book reviews for the Neue Zürcher Zeitung under various pseudonyms (Werner Salasin, Werner Stoutz, and r. e.). Thanks to a travel stipend, he was able to spend the summer of 1937 in Cambridge, England. Finding the situation in Switzerland increasingly untenable, he chose to emigrate to the U.S. in 1938. At pains to conceal both his homosexual orientation and his Jewish ancestry on his mother's side, he maintained that he had been driven into exile on political grounds.

Vortriede's passage to New York aboard the luxury liner SS Nieuw Amsterdam was paid for by the English author Robert Hichens, and he was subsequently supported by grants from the American Guild for German Cultural Freedom, personally meeting with its general secretary, Prince Hubertus zu Löwenstein, in 1943. He enrolled at the University of Cincinnati, where he was employed as a teaching assistant and earned a master's degree in 1939 with a thesis entitled "Hölderlins Spätstil als Mittel zur Deutung seines Weltbilds". On a summer jaunt to Europe, he was caught off-guard by the outbreak of World War II and, as a German passport holder, interned as an enemy alien in France. A few months later he was able to return to the U.S. In New York City he became acquainted with the poets W. H. Auden and Chester Kallman, Saint-John Perse, the author Richard Beer-Hofmann, and the sociologist Christiane Hofmannsthal-Zimmer (the daughter of poet Hugo von Hofmannsthal) as well as the emigre Klaus Mann. The poet Robert Duncan was his lover in Woodstock, New York, where he briefly owned a house (alluded to in the multivalent title of his 1975 memoir Das verlassene Haus, "The Abandoned House"). He was a teaching fellow at Rutgers University and in 1941 was reunited in New York City with his mother, who also emigrated from Germany. He taught briefly at Central Michigan College before he and his mother moved to Evanston when he enrolled at Northwestern University for doctoral study with a major in French literature and a minor in German literature. There he worked as a teaching assistant and completed the Ph.D. in 1945 with a dissertation on "The Conception of the Poet in the Works of Stéphane Mallarmé and Stefan George". He was immediately hired at the rank of instructor by Princeton University, where he taught German for two years, and in 1946 he was naturalized as a U.S. citizen. At this time he became acquainted with the literary scholar Erich von Kahler and the writer Hermann Broch. His sister Fränze arrived in the U.S. in 1947, initially residing in Philadelphia.

Vordtriede was recruited by the University of Wisconsin as an assistant professor in 1947, and he also taught at the Middlebury German Summer School in 1948. He was described by one colleague as a popular teacher "who brought animation to the classroom", for example "by acting out in class the role of the village girl who dreamed of marrying a count" in Gottfried Keller's novella "Kleider machen Leute." He chose to go on personal leave for the academic year 1952–53 to bolster his academic track record by publishing numerous book reviews and articles, especially in the pages of the Wisconsin German Department's house journal Monatshefte. Although he did not yet have a book publication, he was duly promoted to an associate professorship with tenure at the University of Wisconsin in 1954. He now served as a dissertation director for the first time, supervising Roland Hoermann's 1957 thesis on Achim von Arnim's symbolism, and he was awarded a Guggenheim Fellowship in 1957. Beginning in the late 1950s, he made frequent trips to Europe, also visiting his former home in Freiburg. In Madison, he resided in the modest digs of the bachelor faculty housing on the top floor of the University Club. Following his promotion to a full professorship in 1959, still without a book publication, he supervised the doctoral dissertations of Don Travis (on Stefan Andres, 1960), Henry Geitz (on Franz Grillparzer, 1961), and Philip Glander (on Varnhagen von Ense, 1961) before surprising his colleagues by announcing at a departmental meeting his decision to resign from the University of Wisconsin after fourteen years and to relocate to Germany, where he intended to break with the academy and become a freelance author.

== Return to Germany ==
After returning to Germany in 1960, Vordtriede changed plans and successfully applied for a professorship at the Ludwig-Maximilians-Universität München. He held this position for fourteen years until taking early retirement, at age 61, in 1976. He returned to the United States as a visiting professor at Ohio State University in the spring of 1964, at Bryn Mawr College in the fall of 1966, the University of California, Davis from 1968 to 1969, and the University of Massachusetts Amherst in the fall of 1970, thus residing in the U.S. for a total of twenty years. His publications during these years included several editions of canonical German authors, a monograph of literary criticism (Novalis und die französischen Symbolisten), a memoir recounting his first years as an emigre in the United States (Das verlassene Haus. Tagebuch aus dem amerikanischen Exil 1938–1947), an opera libretto, translations of English and French poetry, and numerous journal articles. Following retirement, he realized his ambition to become an author by writing four novels, one of which remained unpublished at his death. His final book publication was a four-volume edition of Stefan George's poetry.

== Death and legacy ==
Colleagues, former students, and friends wrote contributions for a Festschrift honoring Vordtriede on his seventieth birthday, but the volume did not appear until one month after his death. He died, a U.S. citizen, during a study trip near İzmir in September 1985. A lifelong bachelor, he had no descendants and was estranged from his sister as of the 1970s. His colleague and former student Dieter Borchmeyer served as the executor of his estate. Vordtriede had preserved documents pertaining to Nazi Germany as authentic historical records, and along with many letters and other papers, they were bequeathed to the German Literature Archive in Marbach. His correspondence with his mother Käthe Vordtriede was edited for a book publication (1998) and formed the basis for a televised documentary (2001). Käthe Vordtriede is memorialized in Freiburg with a Stolperstein and a street name. Werner Vordtriede was interred in Munich in 1985, and after the expiration of a twenty-year lease for his burial plot, the grave was vacated in accordance with German cemetery practice.

== Vordtriede House Freiburg ==
A private initiative is at work advancing knowledge about the Vordtriede family, whose members Käthe Vordtriede, Frances (Fränze) Vordtriede-Riley, and Werner Vordtriede resided variously from 1926 to 1939 at 4 Fichte Street in the Haslach district of Freiburg before emigrating to the United States via Switzerland and England. The initiative was launched by author Jürgen Lang, who now resides in the landmarked house owned by Bauverein Freiburg. Founded in 2014, the project won a city award for "civic engagement" in 2015. A sponsorship award followed in 2022 in recognition of the project's stance against anti-Semitism, right-wing radicalism, and racism. The plan is to turn the residence into a meeting place and small museum under the motto "Remembering, Researching, Reminding".

== Book publications ==
=== Monograph ===
- Novalis und die französischen Symbolisten. Zur Entstehungsgeschichte eines dichterischen Symbols. Stuttgart: W. Kohlhammer, 1963.

=== Memoir ===
- Das verlassene Haus. Tagebuch aus dem amerikanischen Exil 1938–1947. Munich: Hanser, 1975. Revised and expanded edition. Edited by Ekkehard Faude. With an afterword by Dieter Borchmeyer. Lengwil: Libelle, 2002.

=== Fictional works ===
- Der Nekromant. Text für eine Oper. Munich: Heimeran, 1968. (Music by Peter Förtig.)
- Geheimnisse an der Lummer. Roman. Vienna: Rhombus, 1979.
- Der Innenseiter. Roman. Munich: Steinhausen, 1981.
- Ulrichs Ulrich oder Vorbereitungen zum Untergang. Roman. Munich: List, 1982.

=== Edited volumes ===
- Achim von Arnim
  - Achim von Arnim and Bettina Brentano: Achim und Bettina in ihren Briefen. Briefwechsel Achim von Arnim und Bettina Brentano. Mit einer Einleitung von Rudolf Alexander Schröder. 2 volumes. Frankfurt am Main: Suhrkamp, 1961. Frankfurt am Main: Insel, 1988.
  - Achim von Arnim. Isabella von Agypten. Stuttgart: Reclam, 1964.
- Clemens Brentano:
  - Clemens Brentano. Gedichte. Frankfurt am Main: Insel, 1963.
  - Clemens Brentano. Briefe, Tagebücher, Gespräche, Erinnerungen des Dichters und der Zeitgenossen, die mit ihm in Verbindung standen. Dichter über ihre Dichtungen, vol. 6. Munich: Ernst Heimeran, 1971. Co-editor: Gabriele Bartenschlager.
- Jacob Grimm: Jacob Grimm über seine Entlassung. Frankfurt am Main: Insel, 1964.
- Kinderlieder aus des Knaben Wunderhorn. Frankfurt am Main: Insel, 1964.
- Edith Sitwell: Gedichte. Deutsch und Englisch. Frankfurt am Main: Insel, 1964. Translations by Werner Vordtriede, Erich Fried, and Christian Enzensberger.
- Quirinus Kuhlmann: Aus dem Kühlpsalter. Berlin: K. H. Henssel, 1966.
- Bettina von Arnim: Bettina von Arnims Armenbuch. Frankfurt am Main: Insel, 1969.
- Friedrich Schiller: Friedrich Schiller. Von den Anfängen bis 1795. Dichter über ihre Dichtungen, vol. 3/I. Munich: Ernst Heimeran, 1969. Co-editors: Bodo Lecke, Rudolf Hirsch.
- Heinrich Heine:
  - Heinrich Heine. Sämtliche Werke. 4 volumes. Munich: Winkler, 1969–72. Co-editor: Jost Perfahl. 2nd, revised edition. Munich: Winkler, 1992–94. Co-editor: Erhard Weidl.
  - Heine-Kommentar, vol. 1: Zu den Dichtungen and vol. 2: Zu den Schriften zur Literatur und Politik. Munich: Winkler, 1970. Co-editor: Uwe Schweikert.
  - Heinrich Heine. Dichter über ihre Dichtungen, vol. 8/II. Munich: Ernst Heimeran, 1971. Co-editor: Rudolf Hirsch.
  - Heinrich Heine. Buch der Lieder, Deutschland, ein Wintermärchen und andere Gedichte. Darmstadt: Wissenschaftliche Buchgesellschaft, 1992.
- Therese von Bacheracht and Karl Gutzkow: Unveröffentlichte Briefe. 1842–1849. Munich: Kösel, 1971.
- William Butler Yeats: Werke. 6 volumes. Neuwied: Luchterhand, 1972.
- Stefan George: Werke. 4 volumes. Munich: Deutscher Taschenbuch-Verlag, 1983. Includes French-German translations by Werner Vordtriede.

=== Translations ===
- John Donne: Metaphysische Dichtungen. Frankfurt am Main: Insel, 1961.
- Andrew Marvell: Gedichte. Berlin: Henssel, 1962.
- William Butler Yeats: Liebesgedichte. Darmstadt: Luchterhand, 1976.
- Geh, fang einen Stern, der fällt. Gedichte. Leipzig: Insel, 2001. Includes poems by John Donne, George Herbert, Andrew Marvell, T. S. Eliot.

== Secondary literature ==
- Borchmeyer, Dieter and Till Heimeran. Weimar am Pazifik. Literarische Wege zwischen den Kontinenten. Festschrift für Werner Vordtriede zum 70. Geburtstag. Tübingen: Niemeyer, 1985. ISBN 3-484-10521-6
  - With contributions by Ehrhard Bahr (UCLA), Sigrid Bauschinger (Amherst), Brian Coghlan (University of Adelaide), Donald Crosby (University of Connecticut), John Francis Fetzer (UC Davis), Erich Heller (Northwestern), Jost Hermand (Wisconsin), Walter Hinderer (Princeton), Roland Hoermann (Davis), Christiane Hofmannsthal-Zimmer (New York), Victor Lange (Princeton), Paul Michael Lützeler (Washington University in St. Louis) et al., as well as texts (prose, poetry, and translations) by Werner Vordtriede himself.
- Lang, Jürgen. The Vordtriede Quiz. 50 questions and answers about the emigrated Freiburg family. Norderstedt: BoD, 2016. ISBN 978-3-7392-1764-2
- Schönermark, Gesa. Telemachs Wandlung. Werner Vordtriede. Eine wissenschaftshistorische Biographie. Munich: Herbert Utz, 1995. ISBN 3-8316-7532-5
- Vordtriede, Käthe. "Mir ist es noch wie ein Traum, dass mir diese abenteuerliche Flucht gelang." Briefe nach 1933 aus Freiburg i. Br., Frauenfeld und New York an ihren Werner. Edited by Manfred Bosch. Lengwil: Libelle, 1998. ISBN 3-909081-10-X
