= Tom Brüntrup =

German politician (born 1997)

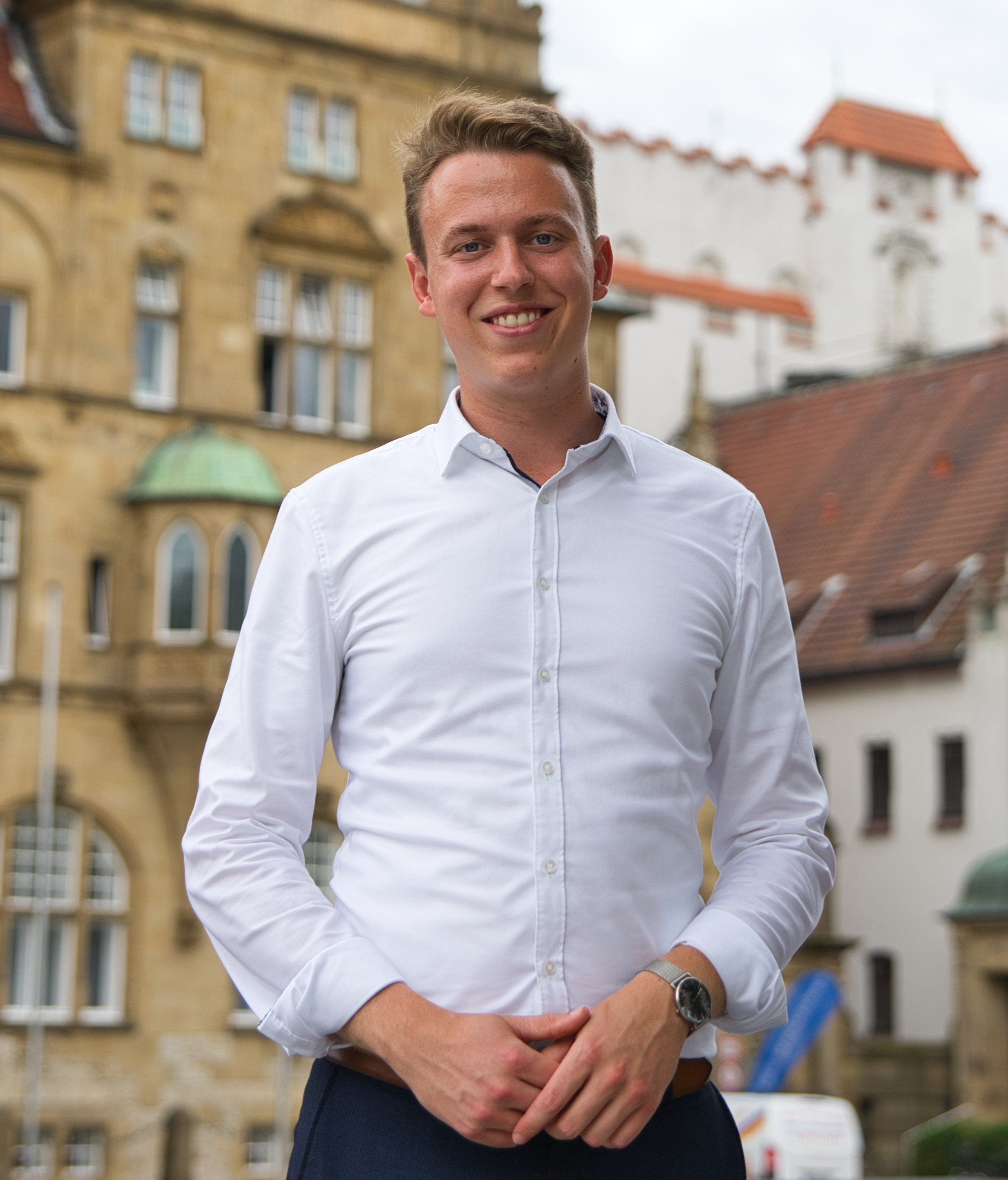
- Brüntrup in 2022

Member of the Landtag of North Rhine-Westphalia
- Incumbent
- Assumed office 1 June 2022
- Preceded by: Regina Kopp-Herr
- Constituency: Bielefeld II

Personal details
- Born: 11 May 1997 (age 28)
- Party: Christian Democratic Union (since 2014)

Tom Brüntrup (born 11 May 1997) is a German politician serving as a member of the Landtag of North Rhine-Westphalia since 2022. He has been a city councillor of Bielefeld since 2020.
