= Hünenburg Telecommunication Tower =

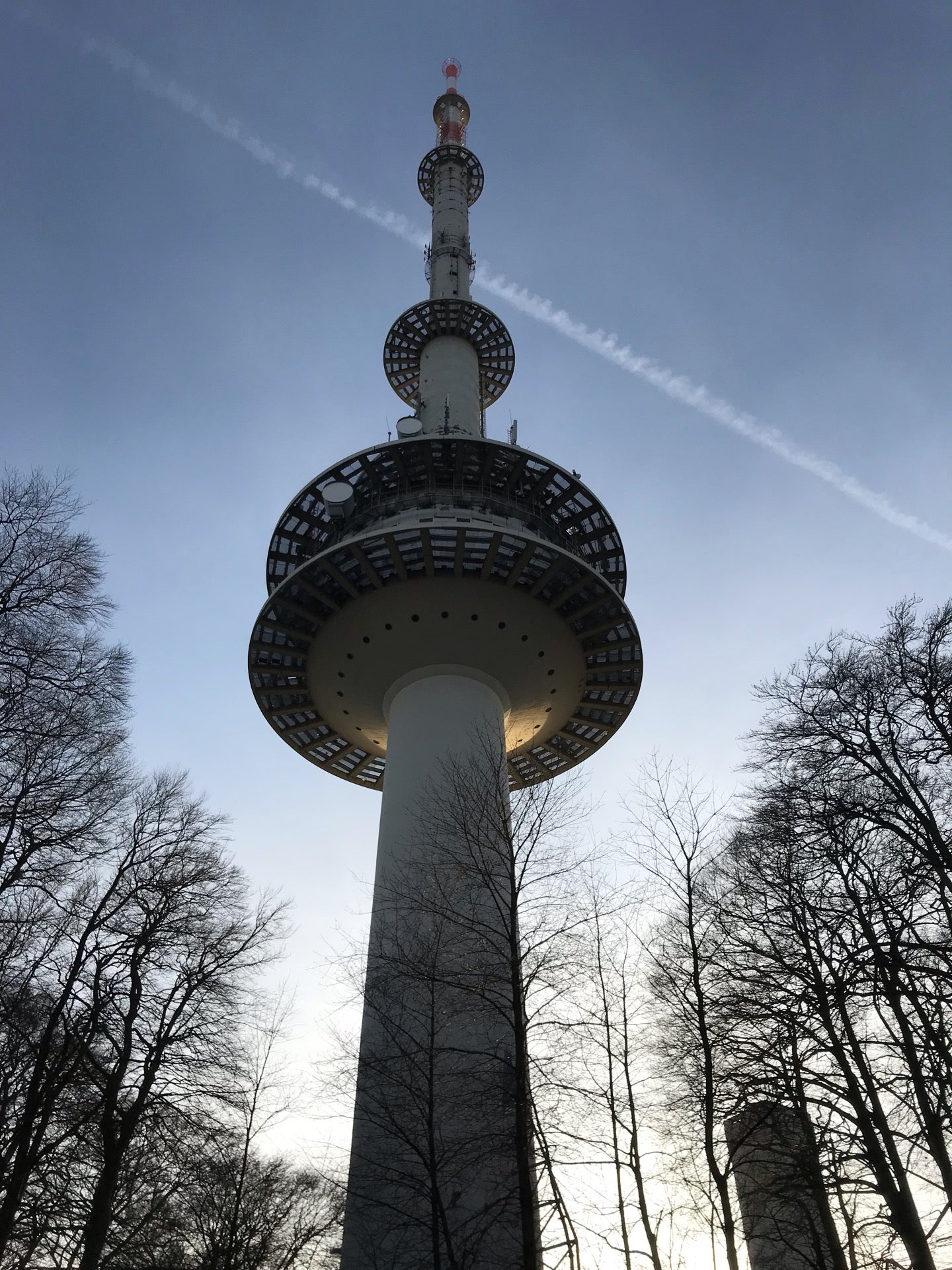
- Fernmeldeturm Hünenburg

- Location within Germany
- Location: Hüneburg
- Tower height: 164 m (538 ft)
- Coordinates: 52.01480°N 8.47461°E
- Built: 1972

Hünenburg Telecommunication Tower is a 164-metre (538 ft) telecommunication tower of Deutsche Telekom AG on Hüneburg near Bielefeld in Germany It is a concrete tower of FMT 3/72 type. It is closed to the public.

The tower was built in 1972 as replacement for a smaller telecommunication tower, built in 1952. The old tower was converted into an observation tower, removing the antenna decks and installing intermediate ceilings. It is now called the Hünenburg Observation Tower and houses a museum and restaurant.

An equipment room is located in the telecommunications tower 40 metres (130 ft) above ground with a volume of 2,500 cubic metres (88,000 cu ft). The room has a 49.6-metre (163 ft) deck with directional antennas.

A second smaller antenna deck is situated 55 metres (180 ft) above ground. Further smaller decks for antennas with directional antennas are situated 89 and 123.5 metres (292 and 405 ft) above ground.

Between 123.5 and 146.25 metres (405.2 and 479.8 ft) above ground, there is a red and white antenna mast with FM-broadcasting antennas. The pinnacle above 146.5 metres (481 ft) carries a glass fibre cylinder with the UHF-TV-broadcasting antennas.

== Radiated TV programmes (before digital switch-over) ==
Programme	Frequency/Channel	ERP
ZDF	E 33	320 kW
WDR Studio Bielefeld	E 46	500 kW
WDR Studio Bielefeld	E 46	500 kW
Sat 1	E 38	0.125 kW
RTL	E 59	1 kW
Vox	E 36	0.5 kW
