= Wilhelmine Lohmann =

German teacher, social worker, and temperance leader (1872 – ?)

Wilhelmine Lohmann (1872 – 1937) was a German teacher, social worker, and temperance leader who served as president of several organizations. She also wrote articles for Die Lehrerin: Organ des Allgemeinen Deutschen Lehrerinnenvereins (The teacher: Organ of the General German Teachers' Association).

== Early life and education ==
Wilhelmine Lohmann was born at Hamm, North Rhine-Westphalia, September 23, 1872.

She was educated at a girls’ higher school in Hamm and at a teachers’ seminary.

== Career ==
From 1891 to 1910, she was engaged in the teaching profession in Brussels, Belgium, at Essen-on-the-Ruhr, and at Bielefeld, Westphalia.

Since 1910, she occupied herself with social service and temperance work in Bielefeld.

Lohmann became actively identified with the struggle against alcoholism in Germany in 1904, when, upon the organization of the Society of Abstaining Women Teachers (Verein Abstinenter Lehrerinnen) she became a member of that society, of which she served for fourteen years (1910–24) as president. In 1905, she affiliated herself with the German League of Abstaining Women (Deutseher Bawd Abstinenter Frauen), and later acted as second president of that organization. Since 1919, she was one of the leaders of the German Central Organization for Temperance Instruction (Deutsche Cent rale filr Nilchternheitsunterricht), and since 1921, a member of the Committee for the Prohibition of Alcohol (Ausschuss filr Alkohol-verbot) and director of the Bielefeld branch office. In 1924, she became second president of the German League of Abstaining Educators (Deutseher liu/nd enthaltsamer Erzieher) and business manager of the International Teachers’ League against Alcoholism (Internationale Lehrerbund gegen den Alkoholismus).

At the International Convention of the World League Against Alcoholism, held at Toronto, Canada, in November 1922, Lohmann testified of her work among German teachers in furthering scientific temperance instruction in that country. In connection with the work of the German Woman's Christian Temperance Union (WCTU), which organization she represented at the convention, she stated that the campaign for temperance instruction in the schools of Germany was inaugurated during the opening years of the twentieth century and that, in spite of opposition on the part of the German Government, the work had been steadily progressing. Lohmann was also a delegate to the Sixteenth International Congress Against Alcoholism, held at Lausanne, Switzerland, in August 1921.

== Selected works ==
- "Die Abstinenz als patriotische Liebestat", Die Lehrerin, 31(1914), 34, pgs, 260–261
- "Die 7. Hauptversammlung des deutschen Vereins abstinenter Lehrerinnen", Die Lehrerin 36(1919), 9, pg. 68
- "Abstinenz und Schule: Jahresbericht des deutschen Vereins abstinenter Lehrerinnen 1919–1920", Die Lehrerin 37(1920), 10, pg. 75
- "Abstinenz und Schule: zur Bekämpfung des Alkohols durch die Erziehung", Die Lehrerin 37(1920), 10, pgs. 75–76
