= Anne Marie Heiler =

German politician (1889–1979)

Member of the Bundestag
- In office 7 September 1949 – 7 September 1953

Personal details
- Born: 21 March 1889 Brackwede
- Died: 17 December 1979 (aged 90) Marburg, Hesse, Germany
- Party: CDU

Anne Marie Heiler (March 21, 1889 – December 17, 1979) was a German politician of the Christian Democratic Union (CDU) and former member of the German Bundestag.

== Life ==
In 1949 she became a member of the first Bundestag via the state list of the Hessian CDU.

== Literature ==
Herbst, Ludolf; Jahn, Bruno (2002). Vierhaus, Rudolf (ed.). Biographisches Handbuch der Mitglieder des Deutschen Bundestages. 1949–2002 [Biographical Handbook of the Members of the German Bundestag. 1949–2002] (in German). München: De Gruyter - De Gruyter Saur. p. 1715. ISBN 978-3-11-184511-1.
