= Berkant Güner =

Turkish footballer

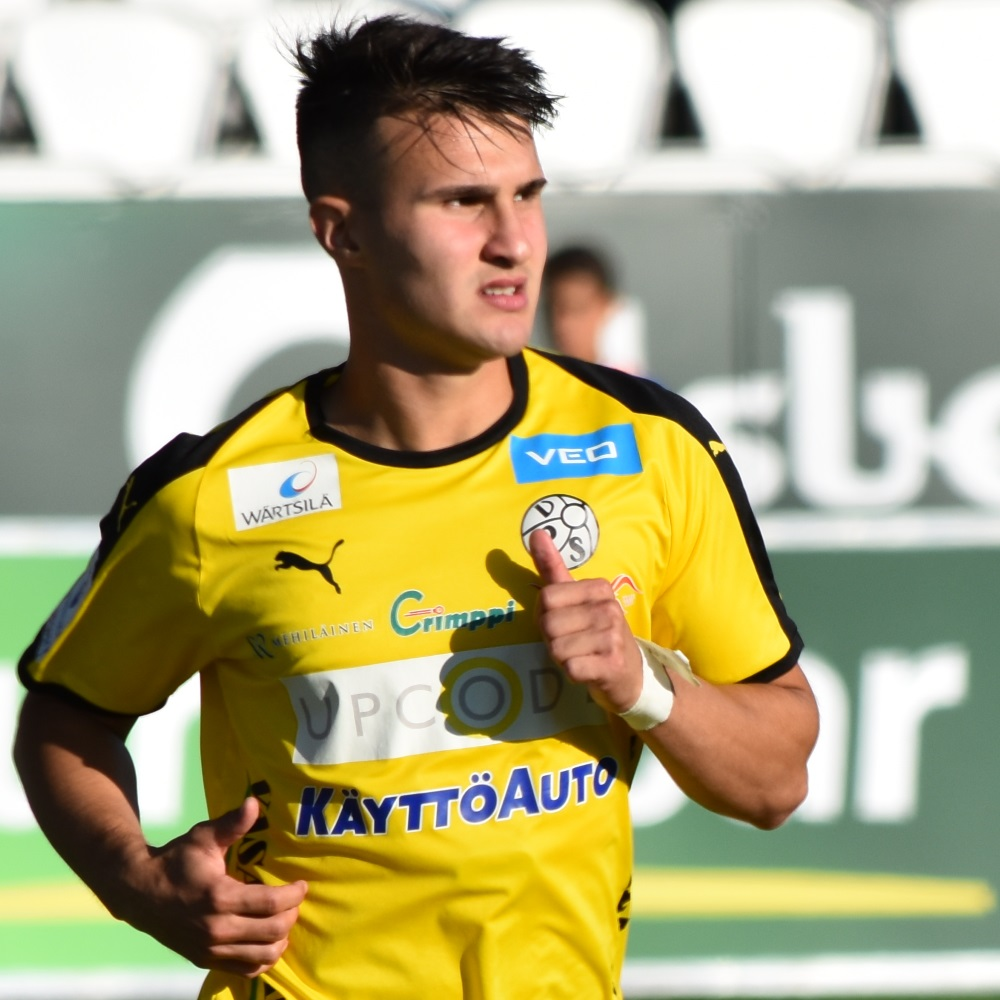
- Güner with VPS in 2018

Personal information
- Date of birth: 19 February 1998 (age 28)
- Place of birth: Bielefeld, Germany
- Height: 1.76 m (5 ft 9 in)
- Position: Midfielder

Youth career
- TuS 08 Senne
- –2011: Arminia Bielefeld
- 2011–2016: Borussia Dortmund
- 2016–2017: Eintracht Braunschweig

Senior career*
Years	Team	Apps	(Gls)
2017–2018	Eintracht Braunschweig II	0	(0)
2018	VPS	13	(0)
2020–2021	FC Gütersloh	0	(0)
2022–2023	SV Rödinghausen	0	(0)

International career^{‡}
2013	Germany U15	5	(0)
2013	Germany U16	1	(0)
2015	Turkey U17	2	(0)
2015	Turkey U18	2	(0)
- * Club domestic league appearances and goals as of 11:54, 10 July 2024 (UTC) ‡ National team caps and goals as of 14:44, 13 June 2018 (UTC)

Berkant Güner (born 19 February 1998) is a Turkish footballer who most recently played as a midfielder for SV Rödinghausen.

== Career ==
At the end of December 2019, FC Gütersloh 2000 confirmed the signing of Güner.

== Career statistics ==
=== Club ===
As of 2 July 2018

Appearances and goals by club, season and competition
Club	Season	League			Cup		Continental		Other		Total	
Club	Season	Division	Apps	Goals	Apps	Goals	Apps	Goals	Apps	Goals	Apps	Goals
VPS	2018	Veikkausliiga	13	0	1 (Note: Appearances in the Finnish Cup)	0	–		0	0	14	0
Career total			13	0	1	0	0	0	0	0	14	0
