= Gitta Kutyniok =

German applied mathematician (born 1972)

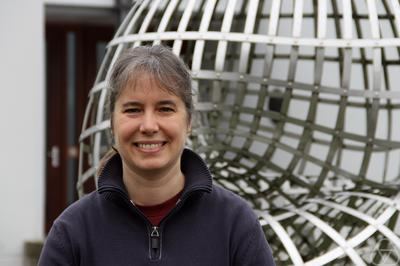
- Kutyniok at Oberwolfach (2015)
- Born: 1972 (age 53–54); Bielefeld, Germany
- Education: Paderborn University
- Scientific career
- Institutions: University of Giessen; Osnabrück University; Technische Universität Berlin; LMU Munich
- Doctoral advisor: Eberhard Kaniuth
- Website: www.ai.math.uni-muenchen.de/index.html

Gitta Kutyniok (born 1972) is a German applied mathematician known for her research in harmonic analysis, deep learning, compressed sensing, and image processing. She has a Bavarian AI Chair for "Mathematical Foundations of Artificial Intelligence" in the institute of mathematics at LMU Munich.

== Education and career ==
Kutyniok was educated in Detmold, and obtained a diploma in mathematics and computer science at Paderborn University in 1996. She then completed her doctorate (Dr. rer. nat.) at Paderborn University in 2000. Her dissertation, Time-Frequency Analysis on Locally Compact Groups, was supervised by Eberhard Kaniuth.

From 2000 to 2008, she held short term positions at Paderborn University, the Georgia Institute of Technology, the University of Giessen, Washington University in St. Louis, Princeton University, Stanford University, and Yale University. In 2006, she earned her habilitation in Giessen, in 2008, she became a full professor at Osnabrück University, and in 2011, she was given the Einstein Chair at Technische Universität Berlin. In 2018, she added courtesy affiliations with computer science and electrical engineering at TU Berlin. In October 2020, she moved to LMU Munich, where she holds a Bavarian AI chair.

Since taking her position in Berlin, she has also visited ETH Zurich, and taken an adjunct faculty position at the University of Tromsø.

== Honors and awards ==
Kutyniok became a member of the Berlin-Brandenburg Academy of Sciences and Humanities in 2016. In 2019 she was named a SIAM Fellow "for contributions to applied harmonic analysis, compressed sensing, and imaging sciences". She was named an IEEE Fellow, in the 2024 class of fellows, "for contributions to the mathematical theory of artificial intelligence in signal processing and communication".

She was the Emmy-Noether Lecturer of the German Mathematical Society in 2013, and has been selected as a plenary speaker at the eighth European Congress of Mathematics, in 2020. In 2021 she was elected Vice President-at-Large for SIAM with term running 1 January 2022 – 31 December 2023.

== Books ==
- Kutyniok, Gitta (2007). Affine density in wavelet analysis. Berlin: Physica-Verlag. ISBN 978-3-540-72949-5. OCLC 184905095.
- Eldar, Yonina C.; Kutyniok, Gitta (2012). Compressed sensing : theory and applications. Cambridge: Cambridge University Press. ISBN 978-0-511-79430-8. OCLC 796803943.
- Kutyniok, Gitta; Labate, Demetrio, eds. (2012). Shearlets : multiscale analysis for multivariate data. Boston: Birkhäuser. ISBN 978-0-8176-8316-0. OCLC 781093846.
- Casazza, Peter G.; Kutyniok, Gitta, eds. (2013). Finite frames : theory and applications. New York: Birkhäuser. ISBN 978-0-8176-8373-3. OCLC 811059043.
- Grohs, Philipp; Kutyniok, Gitta, eds. (2022). Mathematical Aspects of Deep Learning. Cambridge: Cambridge University Press. doi:10.1017/9781009025096. ISBN 978-1-316-51678-2.
