= Erich Marks =

German educationalist (born 1954)

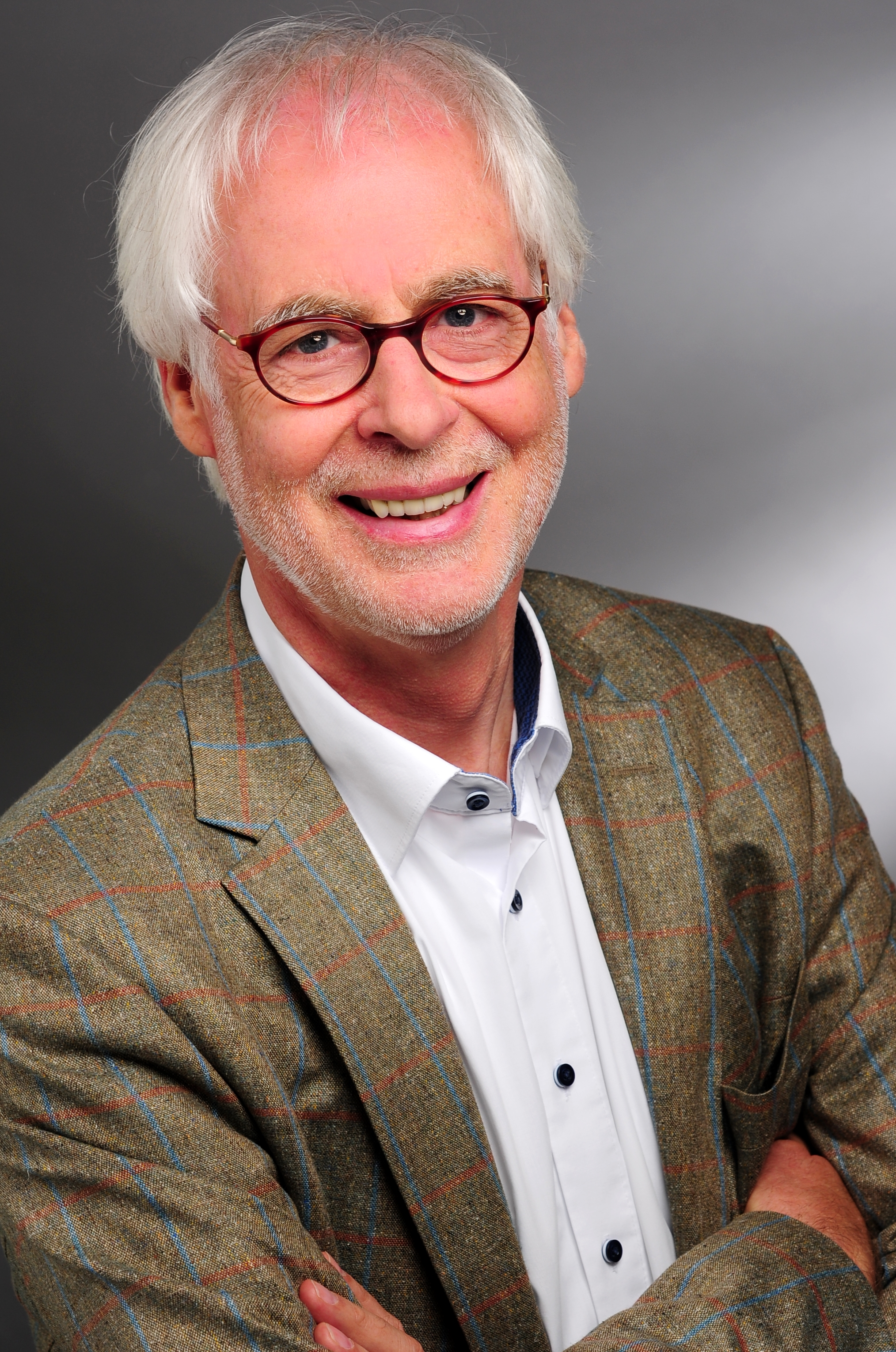
Erich Marks

Erich Marks (born June 22, 1954, in Bielefeld) is a German educationalist and the managing director of the Crime Prevention Council of Lower Saxony. Furthermore, he is the managing director of the German Foundation for Crime Prevention and Offender Support (DVS) as well as the German Congress on Crime Prevention.

== Life ==
After graduating from high school Erich Marks studied educational science, psychology and philosophy at the University of Bielefeld from 1973 to 1980. From 1980 to 1983 he was founding director of Brücke Köln e.V. Following he hold the position of the federal manager of the professional association for social work, criminal law and crime policy (DBH) in Bonn from 1983 to 2001. In 2001/ 2002 he was founding director of the German Forum for Crime Prevention foundation (DFK). For many years already he is managing director of the German Foundation of Crime Prevention and Offender Support (DVS) as well as the German Congress on Crime Prevention. Since 2002 Erich Marks is the CEO of the Crime Prevention Council of Lower Saxony located at the Lower Saxony ministry of justice.

== Key activities ==
His work focuses on Crime Prevention at the national level as well as in the field of international cooperation. Furthermore, Erich Marks is vice-president of the European Forum for Urban Security (EFUS) based in Paris, member of the executive committee from the International Centre for the Prevention of Crime (ICPC) with its head office in Montreal and chairman of the foundation Pro Kind located in Hannover.

== Selection of (English) publications ==
- Quality in crime preventionNorderstedt : Books on Demand GmbH, 2005
- Marc Coester / Erich Marks (Eds.): International Perspectives of Crime Prevention 3 - Contributions from the 3rd Annual International Forum 2009, Mönchengladbach 2011
- Marc Coester / Erich Marks: International Perspectives of Crime Prevention 2 - Contributions from the 2nd Annual International Forum 2008, Mönchengladbach 2009
- Erich Marks: Current Experiences with Crime Prevention in the German and European Context; in: Federal Ministry of Justice (Ed.): Crime Prevention and Criminal Justice - XII. United Nations Congress from 12 to 19 April 2010 in Salvador (Brazil), Berlin 2010, 9-19
- Marc Coester / Erich Marks / Anja Meyer (Eds.): Qualification in Crime Prevention - Status reports from various countries, Mönchengladbach 2008
