= Viktoria Steinbiß =

German politician (1892–1971)

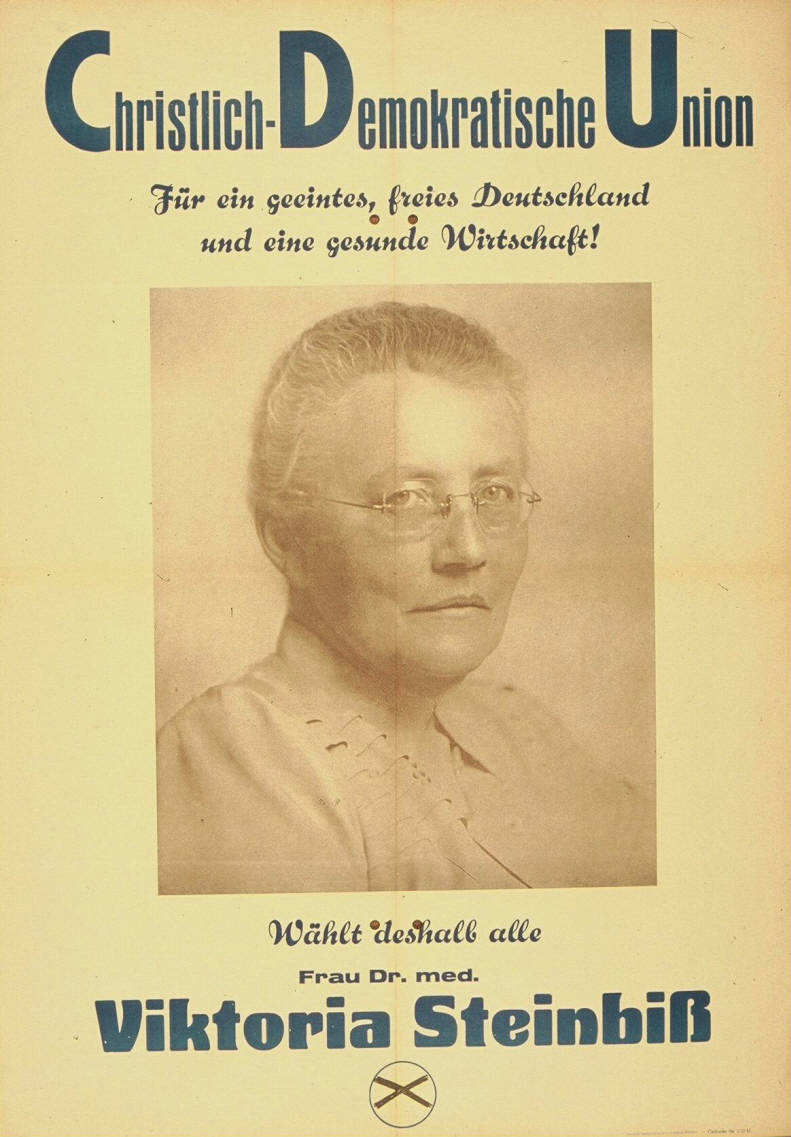
- Viktoria Steinbiß on a poster for the federal election 1949

Member of the Bundestag
- In office 7 September 1949 – 15 October 1961

Personal details
- Born: 19 August 1892
- Died: 11 February 1971 (aged 78)
- Party: CDU

Viktoria Steinbiß (August 19, 1892 – February 11, 1971) was a German politician of the Christian Democratic Union (CDU) and former member of the German Bundestag.

== Life ==
Steinbiß became a member of the CDU in 1945. She was the first woman to be elected to the Bielefeld city council, where she took over the leadership of her party's parliamentary group. In addition, she represented her party in the Provincial Council of Westphalia in 1946 and was deputy zone advisor of the British Zone from 1947 to 1948. From 2 October 1946 to 19 April 1947, she was a member of the first and second Appointed State Parliament of North Rhine-Westphalia, later moving into federal politics and belonging to the German Bundestag since its first election in 1949 to 1961. She was always elected to parliament via the CDU state list of North Rhine-Westphalia. From 1953 to 1961, she was deputy chairperson of the Bundestag Committee on Health Care.

== Literature ==
Herbst, Ludolf; Jahn, Bruno (2002). Vierhaus, Rudolf (ed.). Biographisches Handbuch der Mitglieder des Deutschen Bundestages. 1949–2002 [Biographical Handbook of the Members of the German Bundestag. 1949–2002] (in German). München: De Gruyter - De Gruyter Saur. p. 1715. ISBN 978-3-11-184511-1.
