= Maximilian Hippe =

German footballer

Personal information
- Date of birth: 6 May 1998 (age 28)
- Place of birth: Bielefeld, Germany
- Height: 1.94 m (6 ft 4 in)
- Position: Centre-back

Team information
- Current team: SC Paderborn II
- Number: 5

Youth career
- –2015: VfL Theesen
- 2015–2017: SV Rödinghausen

Senior career*
Years	Team	Apps	(Gls)
2016–2019	SV Rödinghausen II	7	(0)
2017–2019	SV Rödinghausen	31	(2)
2019–2021	Borussia Dortmund II	45	(2)
2021–2022	1. FC Kaiserslautern	8	(0)
2022	1. FC Kaiserslautern II	5	(0)
2023–2026	SV Rödinghausen	106	(6)
2026–	SC Paderborn II	9	(1)
- * Club domestic league appearances and goals as of 23 September 2026

Maximilian Hippe (born 6 May 1998) is a German professional footballer who plays as a centre-back for Regionalliga West club SC Paderborn II.

== Club career ==
Hippe played youth football for VfL Theesen before signing with SV Rödinghausen in 2015.

Hippe's contract with 1. FC Kaiserslautern was terminated by mutual consent on 27 January 2023.

On 29 January 2023, Hippe returned to SV Rödinghausen.

== Career statistics ==
As of 1 July 2022

Appearances and goals by club, season and competition
Club	Season	League			Cup		Other		Total	
Club	Season	Division	Apps	Goals	Apps	Goals	Apps	Goals	Apps	Goals
SV Rödinghausen	2016–17	Regionalliga West	5	0	—		0	0	5	0
SV Rödinghausen	2017–18	Regionalliga West	25	2	—		0	0	25	2
SV Rödinghausen	2018–19	Regionalliga West	1	0	1 (Note: Appearances in the DFB-Pokal)	0	0	0	2	0
SV Rödinghausen	Total		31	2	1	0	0	0	32	2
Borussia Dortmund II	2019–20	Regionalliga West	21	1	—		0	0	21	1
Borussia Dortmund II	2020–21	Regionalliga West	23	1	—		0	0	23	1
Borussia Dortmund II	2021–22	3. Liga	1	0	—		0	0	1	0
Borussia Dortmund II	Total		45	2	0	0	0	0	45	2
1. FC Kaiserslautern	2021–22	3. Liga	8	0	—		0	0	8	0
1. FC Kaiserslautern II	2021–22	Oberliga Rheinland-Pfalz/Saar	0	0	—		1 (Note: Appearance in relegation round)	0	1	0
Career total			90	4	1	0	1	0	92	4
